This is a list of foreign players in La Liga. The following players:
have played at least one La Liga game for the respective club.
have not been capped for the Spanish national team on any level, independently from the birthplace, except for players of Spanish formation born abroad from Spanish parents and players who have been capped for Spanish national team and also for other national teams.
have been born in Spain and were capped by a foreign national team. This includes players who have dual citizenship with Spain.

In bold: players that played at least one La Liga game in 2022–23 season, and the clubs they have played for.

Africa (CAF)

Algeria 

Rachid Aït-Atmane – Sporting – 2015–17
Djamel Belmadi – Celta – 1999–00
Ryad Boudebouz – Betis, Celta – 2017–19
Yacine Brahimi – Granada – 2012–14
Liassine Cadamuro-Bentaïba – Real Sociedad – 2011–14
Sofiane Feghouli – Valencia, Almería – 2010–16
Abdelkader Ghezzal – Levante – 2011–12
Nabil Ghilas – Córdoba, Levante – 2014–16
Foued Kadir – Betis – 2015–16
Mehdi Lacen – Alavés, Racing, Getafe, Málaga – 2005–06, 08–16, 17–18
Rabah Madjer – Valencia – 1987–88
Aïssa Mandi – Betis, Villarreal – 2016–
Carl Medjani – Levante, Leganés – 2015–17
Icham Mouissi – Racing – 2002–03
Moussa Saïb – Valencia – 1997–98
Hassan Yebda – Granada – 2011–14

Angola 
Fernando Mendonça – Deportivo – 1962–63 –  while active.
Hélder Costa – Deportivo, Valencia – 2014–15, 21–22
Jonás Ramalho – Athletic Bilbao, Girona, Osasuna – 2011–13, 17–19, 20–22
Jorge Mendonça – Atlético Madrid, Barcelona, Mallorca – 1958–70 –  while active.
Manucho – Valladolid, Rayo – 2009–10, 12–16
Quinzinho – Rayo – 1999–00

Burkina Faso 
Habib Bamogo – Celta – 2006–07
Bakary Koné – Málaga – 2016–17
Jonathan Zongo – Almería – 2013–15

Burundi 
Mohamed Tchité – Racing – 2007–10

Cameroon 

Henri Bienvenu – Zaragoza – 2012–13
Jean Marie Dongou – Barcelona – 2013–14
Patrick Ekeng – Córdoba – 2014–15
Achille Emaná – Betis – 2008–09
Yan Eteki – Granada – 2019–22
Samuel Eto'o – Real Madrid, Mallorca, Barcelona – 1998–09
Geremi – Real Madrid – 1999–02
Martin Hongla – Granada, Valladolid – 2016–17, 22–
Raymond Kalla – Extremadura – 1998–99
Carlos Kameni – Espanyol, Málaga – 2004–17
Wilfrid Kaptoum – Betis – 2018–20
Stephane Paul Keller – Alavés – 2020–21
Daniel N'Gom Kome – Getafe, Mallorca, Valladolid – 2004–05, 06–08
Lauren – Mallorca – 1998–00
Raoul Loé – Osasuna – 2011–14, 16–17
Modeste M'bami – Almería – 2009–11
Stéphane Mbia – Sevilla – 2013–15
Albert Meyong – Levante – 2006–08
Fabrice Moreau – Rayo, Numancia – 1996–97, 99–00
Dani Ndi – Sporting – 2015–17
Thomas N'Kono – Espanyol – 1982–89
Aloys Nong – Levante – 2013–14
Allan Nyom – Granada, Leganés, Getafe – 2011–15, 18–22
Fabrice Olinga – Málaga – 2012–14
Alex Song – Barcelona – 2012–14
Jacques Songo'o – Deportivo – 1996–01, 03–04
Kévin Soni – Girona, Espanyol – 2017–20
Karl Toko Ekambi – Villarreal – 2018–20
Charlie Took – Mallorca – 2012–13
Pierre Webó – Osasuna, Mallorca – 2003–11
Pierre Womé – Espanyol – 2003–04
André-Frank Zambo Anguissa – Villarreal – 2019–20

Cape Verde 
Bebé – Córdoba, Rayo, Eibar – 2014–19, 21–23
Dady – Osasuna – 2007–10
Héldon – Córdoba – 2014–15
Sandro Mendes – Hércules, Villarreal – 1996–97, 98–99
Garry Rodrigues – Elche – 2013–15
Valdo – Real Madrid, Osasuna, Espanyol, Málaga, Levante – 2001–12, 12–13

Central African Republic 
Geoffrey Kondogbia – Sevilla, Valencia, Atlético Madrid – 2012–14, 17–
Wilfried Zahibo – Valencia – 2015–16

Chad 
Azrack Mahamat – Espanyol – 2010–11

Congo 
Thievy Bifouma – Espanyol, Almería, Granada – 2010–12, 13–14, 14–16
Merveil Ndockyt – Getafe – 2017–18

DR Congo 
Cédric Bakambu – Villarreal – 2015–18
Théo Bongonda – Celta, Cádiz – 2014–17, 22–
Giannelli Imbula – Rayo – 2018–19
Gaël Kakuta – Rayo, Sevilla, Deportivo – 2014–16, 16–17, 18–19
Cedrick Mabwati – Betis – 2013–14
Omenuke Mfulu – Elche – 2020–21

Egypt 
Mido – Celta – 2002–03

Equatorial Guinea 
Carlos Akapo – Huesca, Cádiz – 2018–19, 20–22
Javier Balboa – Real Madrid, Racing – 2005–08
Rodolfo Bodipo – Racing, Alavés, Deportivo – 2002–04, 05–10, 12–13
Iván Bolado – Racing – 2007–08, 09–11
Juan Cuyami – Real Sociedad – 1993–95
Miguel Jones – Atlético Madrid – 1959–67 –  while active.
Josete Miranda – Getafe – 2020–21
Emilio Nsue – Mallorca – 2007–08, 10–13
Jesús Owono – Alavés – 2021–22
Yago Yao – Celta, Recreativo – 2000–03, 05–07
Benjamín Zarandona – Valladolid, Betis, Cádiz – 1994–00, 01–07

Eritrea 
Henok Goitom – Murcia, Valladolid, Almería, Getafe – 2007–11, 15–16

Gabon 
Henry Antchouet – Alavés – 2005–06
Pierre-Emerick Aubameyang – Barcelona – 2021–23
Lévy Madinda – Celta – 2012–16

Gambia 
Bacari – Espanyol – 2011–12
Biri-Biri – Sevilla – 1975–76, 77–78
Saidy Janko – Valladolid – 2020–21
Sulayman Marreh – Granada – 2014–15

Ghana 
Sabit Abdulai – Getafe – 2020–21
Mohammed Abu – Rayo – 2012–13
Lumor Agbenyenu – Mallorca – 2019–20
Joseph Aidoo – Celta – 2019–
Amankwaa Akurugu – Getafe – 2020–
Anthony Annan – Osasuna – 2012–13
Christian Atsu – Málaga – 2015–16
Iddrisu Baba – Mallorca – 2019–20, 21–
Richmond Boakye – Elche – 2013–14
Derek Boateng – Getafe, Eibar – 2009–11, 14–15
Emmanuel Boateng – Levante – 2017–19
Kevin-Prince Boateng – Las Palmas, Barcelona – 2016–17, 18–19
Richard Boateng – Granada – 2013–14
Raphael Dwamena – Levante – 2018–19
Michael Essien – Real Madrid – 2012–13
Mohammed Fatau – Granada, Rayo – 2013–15
Kingsley Fobi – Granada – 2020–21
Bernard Mensah – Getafe – 2015–16
Abdul Mumin – Rayo – 2022–
Sulley Muntari – Deportivo – 2017–18
Riga Mustapha – Levante – 2006–08
Thomas Partey – Almería, Atlético Madrid – 2014–21
Abdullah Quaye – Málaga – 2000–01
Paul Quaye – Espanyol – 2011–12
Baba Rahman – Mallorca – 2019–20
Mohammed Salisu – Valladolid – 2019–20
Jeffrey Sarpong – Real Sociedad – 2010–12
Patrick Twumasi – Alavés – 2018–19
Mubarak Wakaso – Villarreal, Espanyol, Las Palmas, Granada, Alavés – 2010–13, 15–16, 16–20
Iñaki Williams – Athletic Bilbao – 2014–
Joachim Yaw – Real Sociedad – 1995–97

Guinea 
Alhassane "Lass" Bangoura – Rayo, Granada – 2011–16
Mouctar Diakhaby – Valencia – 2018–
Alhassane Keita – Mallorca – 2008–10
Ilaix Moriba – Barcelona, Valencia – 2020–21, 21–
Souleymane Oularé – Las Palmas – 2000–01

Guinea-Bissau 
Alfa Semedo – Espanyol – 2018–19
Formose Mendy – Sporting – 2011–12
Fernando "Nando" Có – Racing – 1997–98

Ivory Coast 

Kanga Akalé – Recreativo – 2008–09
Paul Akouokou – Betis – 2020–
Bobley Anderson – Málaga – 2013–14
Victorien Angban – Granada – 2016–17
Roger Assalé – Leganés – 2019–20
Serge Aurier – Villarreal – 2021–22
Ibrahima Bakayoko – Osasuna – 2003–04
Eric Bailly – Espanyol, Villarreal – 2014–16
Jérémie Boga – Granada – 2016–17
Arthur Boka – Málaga – 2014–16
Cyril Domoraud – Espanyol – 2002–04
Cheick Doukouré – Levante – 2017–19, 20–21
Idrissa Doumbia – Huesca – 2020–21
Seydou Doumbia – Girona – 2018–19
Félix Ettien – Levante – 2004–05, 06–08
Lago Junior – Numancia, Mallorca – 2008–09, 19–20, 21–22, 22–23
Idrissa Keita – Oviedo – 1998–01
Franck Kessié – Barcelona – 2022–
Arouna Koné – Sevilla, Levante – 2007–10, 10–12
Mamadou Koné – Racing, Leganés – 2011–12, 16–17
Serge Alain Maguy – Atlético Madrid – 1993–94
Christian Manfredini – Osasuna – 2002–03
Ahmed Ouattara – Extremadura – 1998–99
Romaric – Sevilla, Espanyol, Zaragoza – 2008–13
Yaya Touré – Barcelona – 2007–10
Lacina Traoré – Sporting – 2016–17
Didier Zokora – Sevilla – 2009–11

Kenya 
McDonald Mariga – Real Sociedad – 2011–12
Michael Olunga – Girona – 2017–18

Madagascar 
Stéphane Collet – Real Sociedad – 2000–01
Franck Rabarivony – Oviedo – 1998–01

Mali 

Abdoulay Diaby – Getafe – 2020–21
Mahamadou Diarra – Real Madrid – 2006–11
Mamady Diarra – Cádiz – 2022–
Youba Diarra – Cádiz – 2022–
Frédéric Kanouté – Sevilla – 2005–12
Ibrahima Kebe – Girona – 2022–
Salif Keïta – Valencia – 1973–76
Seydou Keita – Sevilla, Barcelona, Valencia – 2007–12, 13–14
Youssouf Koné – Elche – 2020–21
Aly Mallé – Granada – 2016–17
Abdoul Sissoko – Granada – 2014–15
Mohamed Sissoko – Valencia, Levante – 2003–05, 13–15
El Bilal Touré – Almería – 2022–

Mauritania 
Aly Abeid – Levante – 2017–18
Moctar Sidi El Hacen – Levante, Valladolid – 2017–19
Abdallahi Mahmoud – Alavés – 2019–21

Morocco 

Abderrazak ben Mohamed – Murcia – 1950–51
Selim Amallah – Valladolid – 2022–
Nordin Amrabat – Málaga, Leganés – 2013–16, 17–18
Nabil Baha – Málaga – 2008–11
Abdelaziz Barrada – Getafe – 2011–13
Salaheddine Bassir – Deportivo – 1997–99
Abdallah Ben Barek – Granada, Málaga – 1957–58, 62–63, 65–66, 67–68
Larbi Benbarek – Atlético Madrid – 1948–54
Zakarya Bergdich – Valladolid – 2013–14
Yassine Bounou "Bono" – Girona, Sevilla – 2017–
Sofiane Boufal – Celta – 2018–19
Mehdi Carcela-González – Granada – 2016–17
Sofian Chakla – Villarreal, Getafe – 2019–
Saïd Chiba – Compostela – 1996–98
Lahsen Ben Mohamed "Chicha" – Atlético Tetuán – 1951–52
Issam El Adoua – Levante – 2013–15
Youssef El-Arabi – Granada – 2012–16
Moulay El Ghareff – Tenerife – 1989–90
Munir El Haddadi – Barcelona, Valencia, Alavés, Sevilla, Getafe – 2014–
Mounir El Hamdaoui – Málaga – 2013–14
Omar El Hilali – Espanyol – 2022–
Jawad El Yamiq – Valladolid – 2020–21, 22–
Nabil El Zhar – Levante, Las Palmas, Leganés – 2011–19
Youssef En-Nesyri – Málaga, Leganés, Sevilla – 2016–
Abde Ezzalzouli "Ez Abde" – Barcelona, Osasuna – 2021–
Hassan Fadil – Mallorca, Málaga – 1986–89
Fayçal Fajr – Elche, Deportivo, Getafe – 2014–18, 19–20
Zouhair Feddal – Levante, Alavés, Betis, Valladolid – 2015–20, 22–23
Mustapha Hadji – Deportivo, Espanyol – 1997–99, 03–04
Achraf Hakimi – Real Madrid – 2017–18
Oussama Idrissi – Sevilla, Cádiz – 2020–21, 21–22
Jacob Azafrani "Jaco" – Atlético Tetuán, Las Palmas, Granada – 1951–52, 55–58
Abderrahman Kabous – Murcia – 2007–08
Mohamed Ben Mahjoub – Racing – 1950–53
Hachim Mastour – Málaga – 2015–16
Mohammed El Yaagoubi "Moha" – Osasuna, Espanyol – 2000–01, 02–08
Hassan Nader – Mallorca – 1990–92
Noureddine Naybet – Deportivo – 1996–04
Yacine Qasmi – Rayo – 2021–22
Walid Regragui – Racing – 2004–06
Chadi Riad – Barcelona – 2022–
Mohamed Riahi – Córdoba, Espanyol – 1962–65
Oussama Tannane – Las Palmas – 2017–18
Adnane Tighadouini – Málaga – 2015–16
Mohammed Timoumi – Murcia – 1986–87
Nabil Touaizi – Espanyol – 2022–
Anuar Tuhami – Valladolid – 2018–20, 22–
Ezzaki Badou "Zaki" – Mallorca – 1986–88, 89–92

Mozambique 
Reinildo Mandava – Atlético Madrid – 2021–
Simão Mate Junior – Levante – 2012–16
Armando Sá – Villarreal, Espanyol – 2004–06

Nigeria 

Mutiu Adepoju – Racing, Real Sociedad – 1993–00
Uche Henry Agbo – Granada, Rayo – 2014–17, 18–19
Wilfred Agbonavbare – Rayo – 1992–94, 95–96
Festus Agu – Compostela – 1995–96
Emmanuel Amuneke – Barcelona – 1996–97
Emmanuel Apeh – Celta – 2018–19
Chidozie Awaziem – Leganés – 2019–20
Ramon Azeez – Almería, Granada – 2013–15, 19–21
Samuel Chukwueze – Villarreal – 2018–
Elderson Echiéjilé – Sporting – 2016–17
Oghenekaro Etebo – Las Palmas, Getafe – 2017–18, 19–20
Imoh Ezekiel – Las Palmas – 2017–18
Finidi George – Betis, Mallorca – 1996–01, 03–04
Brown Ideye – Málaga – 2017–18
Odion Ighalo – Granada – 2011–14
Victor Ikpeba – Betis – 2001–02
Christopher Kanu – Alavés – 2001–02
Olarenwaju Kayode – Girona – 2017–18
Abass Lawal – Albacete – 2003–05
Obafemi Martins – Levante – 2012–13
Emmanuel Nosakhare "Nosa" – Betis – 2012–14
Kelechi Nwakali – Huesca – 2020–21
Victor Obinna – Málaga – 2009–10
Bartholomew Ogbeche – Valladolid – 2007–09
Christopher Ohen – Compostela – 1994–98
Samuel Okunowo – Barcelona – 1998–99
Kenneth Omeruo – Leganés – 2018–20
Peter Rufai – Hércules, Deportivo – 1996–99
Umar Sadiq – Almería, Real Sociedad – 2022–
Moses Simon – Levante – 2018–19
Isaac Success – Granada, Málaga – 2014–16, 17–18
Stephen Sunday "Sunny" – Valencia, Osasuna – 2007–09
Ikechukwu Uche – Recreativo, Getafe, Zaragoza, Granada, Villarreal, Málaga – 2006–12, 13–15, 15–16
Kalu Uche – Almería, Espanyol, Levante – 2007–11, 11–12, 14–15
Nduka Ugbade – Castellón – 1989–91
Francis Uzoho – Deportivo – 2017–18
Rashidi Yekini – Sporting – 1995–97

Senegal 
Abdoulaye Ba – Rayo – 2014–15, 18–19
Khouma Babacar – Racing – 2011–12
Ibrahima Baldé – Atlético Madrid, Osasuna – 2009–10, 11–12
Pathé Ciss – Rayo – 2021–
Boulaye Dia – Villarreal – 2021–22
Pape Diakhaté – Granada – 2011–14
Pape Maly Diamanka – Rayo – 2011–12
Baba Diawara – Sevilla, Levante, Getafe – 2011–15
Papakouli Diop – Racing, Levante, Espanyol, Eibar – 2009–21
Pape Cheikh Diop – Celta – 2015–17, 19–20
Mamadou Fall – Villarreal – 2022–
Sekou Gassama – Valladolid – 2022–23
Pape Gueye – Sevilla – 2022–
Nicolas Jackson – Villarreal – 2021–
Mamadou Loum – Alavés – 2021–22
Momo Mbaye – Cádiz – 2022–
Guirane N'Daw – Zaragoza – 2010–11
Alfred N'Diaye – Betis, Villarreal – 2013–14, 15–17, 17–18
Amath Ndiaye – Getafe, Mallorca – 2017–20, 21–
Sylvain N'Diaye – Levante – 2006–07
Mamor Niang – Getafe – 2020–21
Youssouf Sabaly – Betis – 2021–
Arona Sané – Atlético Madrid – 2017–18
Mohamed Sarr – Hércules – 2010–11
Mamadou Sylla – Espanyol, Alavés, Rayo – 2015–16, 21–22
Pape Thiaw – Alavés – 2005–06
Moussa Wagué – Barcelona – 2018–20

South Africa 
Quinton Fortune – Atlético Madrid – 1995–99
Tsepo Masilela – Getafe – 2011–12
Benni McCarthy – Celta – 1999–03
Nasief Morris – Recreativo, Racing – 2008–10
Sizwe Motaung – Tenerife – 1996–97
David Nyathi – Tenerife – 1996–97

Togo 
Emmanuel Adebayor – Real Madrid – 2010–11
Djené Dakonam – Getafe – 2017–

Tunisia 
Aymen Abdennour – Valencia – 2015–17
Mehdi Nafti – Racing – 2000–01, 02–05
Lassad Nouioui – Deportivo – 2008–11
Abdelkader Oueslati – Atlético Madrid – 2012–13

Zimbabwe 
Tino Kadewere – Mallorca – 2022–

Asia (AFC)

Australia 
John Aloisi – Osasuna, Alavés – 2001–06
Awer Mabil – Cádiz – 2022–23
Mathew Ryan – Valencia, Real Sociedad – 2015–17, 21–22
Aurelio Vidmar – Tenerife – 1996–97

China PR 

Wu Lei – Espanyol – 2018–20, 21–22
Zhang Chengdong – Rayo – 2015–16

Indonesia 
Jordi Amat – Espanyol, Rayo, Betis – 2009–13, 17–19

Iran 
Javad Nekounam – Osasuna – 2006–12
Masoud Shojaei – Osasuna – 2008–13

Japan 
Mike Havenaar – Córdoba – 2014–15
Hiroshi Ibusuki – Sevilla – 2011–12
Akihiro Ienaga – Mallorca – 2010–12
Takashi Inui – Eibar, Betis, Alavés – 2015–21
Shoji Jo – Valladolid – 1999–00
Hiroshi Kiyotake – Sevilla – 2016–17
Takefusa Kubo – Mallorca, Villarreal, Getafe, Real Sociedad – 2019–
Yoshinori Muto – Eibar – 2020–21
Shunsuke Nakamura – Espanyol – 2009–10
Akinori Nishizawa – Espanyol – 2000–01
Shinji Okazaki – Huesca – 2020–21
Yoshito Ōkubo – Mallorca – 2004–06
Gaku Shibasaki – Getafe – 2017–19

Malaysia 
Ignacio "Natxo" Insa – Valencia, Villarreal, Celta – 2006–07, 10–11, 12–13

Philippines 
Gregorio Ameztoy – Zaragoza, Atlético Madrid, Gimnàstic – 1939–41, 42–46, 47–48
Ignacio Larrauri – Athletic Bilbao – 1941–42
Julio Uriarte – Zaragoza – 1939–41, 42–43

Qatar 
Akram Afif – Sporting – 2016–17

Saudi Arabia 
Salem Al-Dawsari – Villarreal – 2017–18
Fahad Al-Muwallad – Levante – 2017–18

South Korea 
Ki Sung-yueng – Mallorca – 2019–20
Kim Young-gyu "Kiu" – Almería – 2013–14
Lee Chun-soo – Real Sociedad, Numancia – 2003–05
Lee Ho-jin – Racing – 2005–06
Lee Kang-in – Valencia, Mallorca – 2018–
Paik Seung-ho – Girona – 2018–19
Park Chu-young – Celta – 2012–13

Thailand 
Teerasil Dangda – Almería – 2014–15

Europe (UEFA)

Albania 
Iván Balliu – Rayo – 2021–
Keidi Bare – Espanyol – 2021–
Valdet Rama – Valladolid – 2012–14
Armando Sadiku – Levante – 2017–18
Myrto Uzuni – Granada – 2021–22

Andorra 
Lluís Basagaña – Espanyol – 1984–85
Antoni "Toni" Lima – Espanyol – 1991–92
Jesús Lucendo – Barcelona – 1989–90

Armenia 
Varazdat Haroyan – Cádiz – 2021–22
Aras Özbiliz – Rayo – 2015–16

Austria 

David Alaba – Real Madrid – 2021–
Peter Artner – Hércules – 1996–97
Yusuf Demir – Barcelona – 2021–22
Fritz Hollaus – Atlético Madrid, Mallorca – 1957–58, 60–61
Andreas Ivanschitz – Levante – 2013–15
Kurt Jara – Valencia – 1973–75
Otto Konrad – Zaragoza – 1996–98
Hans Krankl – Barcelona – 1978–80, 80–81
Dietmar Kühbauer – Real Sociedad – 1997–00
Andreas Ogris – Espanyol – 1990–91
Thomas Parits – Granada – 1974–76
Toni Polster – Sevilla, Logroñés, Rayo – 1988–93
Marcus Pürk – Real Sociedad – 1995–96
Gerhard Rodax – Atlético Madrid – 1990–91
Helmut Senekowitsch – Betis – 1961–64
Kurt Welzl – Valencia – 1981–83
Maximilian Wöber – Sevilla – 2018–19
Peter Wurz – Espanyol – 1988–89

Azerbaijan 
Vali Gasimov – Betis, Albacete – 1994–96
Eddy Pascual Israfilov – Granada, Eibar – 2014–16

Belarus 

Egor Filipenko – Málaga – 2014–16
Sergei Gurenko – Zaragoza – 2000–01
Alexander Hleb – Barcelona – 2008–09
Andrei Zygmantovich – Racing – 1993–96

Belgium 

Toby Alderweireld – Atlético Madrid – 2013–14
Zakaria Bakkali – Valencia, Deportivo – 2015–18
Michy Batshuayi – Valencia – 2018–19
Yannick Carrasco – Atlético Madrid – 2015–18, 19–
Gert Claessens – Oviedo – 1999–00
Thibaut Courtois – Atlético Madrid, Real Madrid – 2011–14, 18–
Theo Custers – Espanyol – 1981–83
Tom De Mul – Sevilla – 2007–09
Landry Dimata – Espanyol – 2021–22
Ronald Gaspercic – Extremadura, Betis, Albacete – 1998–99, 01–03, 04–05
Fernand Goyvaerts – Barcelona, Real Madrid, Elche – 1963–68
Eden Hazard – Real Madrid – 2019–
Adnan Januzaj – Real Sociedad, Sevilla – 2017–
Roland Lamah – Osasuna – 2011–13
Erwin Lemmens – Racing, Espanyol – 1999–01, 02–05
Dominique Lemoine – Espanyol – 1996–98
Maxime Lestienne – Málaga – 2017–18
Charly Musonda – Betis – 2015–17
Marvin Ogunjimi – Mallorca – 2011–12
Largie Ramazani – Almería – 2022–
Davy Roef – Deportivo – 2016–17
Axel Smeets – Salamanca – 1997–98
Thomas Vermaelen – Barcelona – 2014–16, 17–19
Axel Witsel – Atlético Madrid – 2022–

Bosnia-Herzegovina 
Elvir Baljić – Real Madrid, Rayo – 1999–00, 01–02
Bernard Barnjak – Castellón – 1990–91 –  while active.
Elvir Bolić – Rayo – 2000–03
Ermedin Demirović – Alavés – 2017–18
Emir Granov – Rayo – 2001–02
Nebojša Gudelj – Logroñés – 1994–95
Vladimir Gudelj – Celta – 1992–99
Faruk Hadžibegić – Betis – 1985–87 –  while active.
Dennis Hadžikadunić – Mallorca – 2022–
Izet Hajrović – Eibar – 2015–16
Sead Halilović – Valladolid – 1995–96
Mirsad Hibić – Sevilla, Atlético Madrid – 1996–97, 99–00, 02–04
Mehmed Janjoš – Hércules – 1985–86 –  while active.
Predrag Jurić – Real Burgos – 1990–92 –  while active.
Kenan Kodro – Osasuna, Athletic Bilbao, Valladolid – 2016–17, 18–21
Meho Kodro – Real Sociedad, Barcelona, Tenerife, Alavés – 1991–00
Haris Medunjanin – Valladolid, Deportivo – 2008–10, 14–15
Dušan Mijić – Espanyol – 1991–92 –  while active.
Nikola Milinković – Lleida – 1993–94
Miralem Pjanić – Barcelona – 2020–21
Sanjin Prcić – Levante – 2018–19
Milorad Ratković – Celta – 1992–98
Dragan Simić – Burgos – 1979–80 –  while active.
Emir Spahić – Sevilla – 2011–13
Miroslav Stevanović – Sevilla, Elche – 2012–14
Ognjen Vranješ – Sporting – 2015–16

Bulgaria 

Ivaylo Andonov – Albacete – 1994–95
Diyan Angelov – Osasuna – 1991–93
Georgi Dimitrov – Mallorca – 1990–91
Blagoy Georgiev – Alavés – 2005–06
Bozhidar Iskrenov – Zaragoza – 1988–89
Trifon Ivanov – Betis – 1990–91
Ilian Kiriakov – Deportivo – 1991–93
Emil Kostadinov – Deportivo – 1994–95
Petar Kurdov – Mallorca – 1989–90
Vladimir Manchev – Levante, Valladolid – 2004–05, 07–08
Luboslav Penev – Valencia, Atlético Madrid, Compostela, Celta – 1989–99
Martin Petrov – Atlético Madrid, Espanyol – 2005–07, 12–13
Nasko Sirakov – Zaragoza, Espanyol – 1988–91
Hristo Stoichkov – Barcelona – 1990–95, 96–98
Georgi Yordanov – Sporting – 1990–93
Velko Yotov – Espanyol – 1994–95

Croatia 

Stjepan Andrijašević – Celta, Rayo – 1993–94, 95–97
Aljoša Asanović – Valladolid – 1995–96
Marko Babić – Betis, Zaragoza – 2007–09, 09–10
Ivica Barbarić – Real Burgos – 1990–92 –  while active.
Mate Bilić – Zaragoza, Sporting – 2001–02, 08–12
Nenad Bjelica – Albacete, Betis – 1992–98
Zvonimir Boban – Celta – 2001–02
Milivoj Bračun – Elche – 1988–89 –  while active.
Filip Bradarić – Celta – 2019–20
Ante Budimir – Mallorca, Osasuna – 2019–
Duje Čop – Málaga, Sporting, Valladolid – 2015–17, 18–19
Igor Cvitanović – Real Sociedad – 1997–99
Vlatko Đolonga – Alavés – 2000–01
Tomislav Dujmović – Zaragoza – 2011–12
Nenad Gračan – Oviedo – 1989–93 –  while active.
Ivo Grbić – Atlético Madrid – 2022–
Alen Halilović – Sporting, Las Palmas – 2015–16, 16–18
Stefan Hohnjec – Racing – 1978–79 –  while active.
Janko Janković – Valladolid, Oviedo, Hércules – 1988–95, 96–97 –  while active.
Robert Jarni – Betis, Real Madrid, Las Palmas – 1995–99, 00–01
Joško Jeličić – Sevilla – 1995–97
Nikola Jerkan – Oviedo – 1990–96 –  while active.
Goran Jurić – Celta – 1992–93
Ivan Jurić – Sevilla – 1999–00
Nikola Kalinić – Atlético Madrid – 2018–19
Siniša Končalović – Mallorca – 1991–92
Mateo Kovačić – Real Madrid – 2015–18
Sergio Krešić – Burgos – 1976–78 –  while active.
Ivan Leko – Málaga – 2001–05
Marko Livaja – Las Palmas – 2016–17
Mario Mandžukić – Atlético Madrid – 2014–15
Danko Matrljan – Logroñés – 1987–88
Goran Milanko – Cádiz – 1991–93
Branko Miljuš – Valladolid – 1988–90 –  while active.
Luka Modrić – Real Madrid – 2012–
Ivica Mornar – Sevilla – 1996–97
Ante Palaversa – Getafe – 2020–21
Mario Pašalić – Elche – 2014–15
Dubravko Pavličić – Hércules, Salamanca – 1996–99
Alen Peternac – Valladolid, Zaragoza – 1995–01
Stipe Pletikosa – Deportivo – 2015–16
Nenad Pralija – Espanyol – 1996–99
Robert Prosinečki – Real Madrid, Oviedo, Barcelona, Sevilla – 1991–97
Josip Radošević – Eibar – 2015–16
Ivan Rakitić – Sevilla, Barcelona – 2010–
Mauro Ravnić – Valladolid, Lleida – 1988–92, 93–94 –  while active.
Marko Rog – Sevilla – 2018–19
Sammir – Getafe – 2013–15
Daniel Šarić – Sporting – 1993–95
Dragan Skočić – Compostela – 1994–96
Mario Stanić – Sporting – 1993–94
Igor Štimac – Cádiz – 1992–93
Davor Šuker – Sevilla, Real Madrid – 1991–99
Ivica Šurjak – Zaragoza – 1984–85
Zoran Varvodić – Cádiz – 1992–93
Goran Vlaović – Valencia – 1996–00
Šime Vrsaljko – Atlético Madrid – 2016–18, 19–22
Goran Vučević – Barcelona, Mérida – 1992–93, 95–96
Jurica Vučko – Alavés – 2000–02
Zoran Vulić – Mallorca – 1989–91 –  while active.

Czech Republic 
Radek Bejbl – Atlético Madrid – 1996–00
Michal Bílek – Betis – 1990–91 –  while active.
Yanko Daucik – Betis, Real Madrid, Espanyol – 1960–64, 70–71 –  while active.
Jiří Hanke – Barcelona, Condal – 1952–57 –  while active.
Pavel Hapal – Tenerife – 1995–96
Jakub Jankto – Getafe – 2021–22
Petr Kouba – Deportivo – 1996–97, 99–00
Jaroslav Plašil – Osasuna – 2007–09
Tomáš Ujfaluši – Atlético Madrid – 2008–11
Tomáš Vaclík – Sevilla – 2018–21

Denmark 

Søren Andersen – Lleida – 1993–94
Stephan Andersen – Betis – 2013–14
Frank Arnesen – Valencia – 1981–82
Nicki Bille – Villarreal, Rayo – 2010–11, 12–13
Martin Braithwaite – Leganés, Barcelona, Espanyol – 2018–
Kenneth Brylle – Sabadell – 1986–87
Andreas Christensen – Barcelona – 2022–
Bent Christensen – Compostela – 1994–97
Tommy Christensen – Elche – 1984–85
Thomas Delaney – Sevilla – 2021–23
Kasper Dolberg – Sevilla – 2022–23
Morten Donnerup – Racing – 1985–86
Riza Durmisi – Betis – 2016–18
Ronnie Ekelund – Barcelona – 1993–94
Thomas Gravesen – Real Madrid – 2004–06
Jesper Grønkjær – Atlético Madrid – 2004–05
René Hansen – Las Palmas – 1986–87
Andrew Hjulsager – Celta – 2016–18, 18–19
Michael Jakobsen – Almería – 2010–11
Daniel Jensen – Murcia – 2003–04
Henning Jensen – Real Madrid – 1976–79
Mathias Jensen – Celta – 2018–19
Jens Jønsson – Cádiz – 2020–22
Filip Jörgensen – Villarreal – 2022–
Simon Kjær – Sevilla – 2017–19
Michael Krohn-Dehli – Celta, Sevilla, Deportivo – 2012–18
Michael Laudrup – Barcelona, Real Madrid – 1989–96
John Lauridsen – Espanyol, Málaga – 1981–90
Børge Mathiesen – Racing – 1950–51
Peter Møller – Oviedo – 1998–01
Patrick Mtiliga – Málaga – 2009–11
Michael Pedersen – Osasuna – 1985–87
Christian Poulsen – Sevilla – 2006–08
Thomas Rytter – Sevilla – 1996–97
Allan Simonsen – Barcelona – 1979–82
Pione Sisto – Celta – 2016–20
Morten Skoubo – Real Sociedad – 2005–07
Kris Stadsgaard – Málaga – 2010–11
Jon Dahl Tomasson – Villarreal – 2006–08
Daniel Wass – Celta, Valencia, Atlético Madrid – 2015–22

England 

Dalian Atkinson – Real Sociedad – 1990–91
Peter Barnes – Betis – 1982–83
David Beckham – Real Madrid – 2003–07
Stan Collymore – Oviedo – 2000–01
Laurie Cunningham – Real Madrid, Sporting – 1979–82, 83–84
Mark Draper – Rayo – 1999–00
Adrian Heath – Espanyol – 1988–89
Charlie I'Anson – Elche – 2013–14
Sammy Lee – Osasuna – 1987–89
Gary Lineker – Barcelona – 1986–89
Harry Lowe – Real Sociedad – 1934–35
Steve McManaman – Real Madrid – 1999–03
Raphael Meade – Betis – 1987–88
Michael Owen – Real Madrid – 2004–05
Jermaine Pennant – Zaragoza – 2009–10
Kevin Richardson – Real Sociedad – 1990–91
Patrick Roberts – Girona – 2018–19
Vinny Samways – Las Palmas, Sevilla – 2000–03
Kieran Trippier – Atlético Madrid – 2019–22
Jonathan Woodgate – Real Madrid – 2004–06

Finland 

Jari Litmanen – Barcelona – 1999–00
Teemu Pukki – Sevilla – 2008–09
Jukka Raitala – Osasuna – 2011–12

France 

Eric Abidal – Barcelona – 2007–13
Ibrahim Amadou – Sevilla, Leganés – 2018–19, 19–20
Jordan Amavi – Getafe – 2022–
Nicolas Anelka – Real Madrid – 1999–00
Alphonse Areola – Villarreal, Real Madrid – 2015–16, 19–20
Loïc Badé – Sevilla – 2022–
Paul Baysse – Málaga – 2017–18
Hatem Ben Arfa – Valladolid – 2019–20
Wissam Ben Yedder – Sevilla – 2016–19
Karim Benzema – Real Madrid – 2009–
Grégory Béranger – Espanyol – 2008–09
Mathieu Berson – Levante – 2006–08
Laurent Blanc – Barcelona – 1996–97
Yann Bodiger – Cádiz – 2020–21
Alain Boghossian – Espanyol – 2002–03
Jérôme Bonnissel – Deportivo – 1996–99
Jérémie Bréchet – Real Sociedad – 2004–06
Ludovic Butelle – Valencia, Valladolid – 2005–08
Eduardo Camavinga – Real Madrid – 2021–
Étienne Capoue – Villarreal – 2020–
Lionel Carole – Sevilla – 2017–18
Sébastien Chabaud – Gimnàstic – 2006–07
Mohamed-Ali Cho – Real Sociedad – 2022–
Philippe Christanval – Barcelona – 2001–03
Michaël Ciani – Espanyol – 2015–16
Aly Cissokho – Valencia – 2012–13
José Cobos – Espanyol – 1996–98
Alexandre Coeff – Granada – 2013–14
Francis Coquelin – Valencia, Villarreal – 2017–
Sébastien Corchia – Sevilla, Espanyol – 2017–18, 19–20
Grégory Coupet – Atlético Madrid – 2008–09
Laurent Courtois – Levante – 2006–08
Pascal Cygan – Villarreal – 2006–09
Mouhamadou Dabo – Sevilla – 2010–11
Stéphane Dalmat – Racing – 2005–06
Wilfried Dalmat – Racing – 2005–06
Frédéric Danjou – Oviedo – 1999–01
Georges Dard – Sevilla – 1948–49
Frédéric Déhu – Barcelona, Levante – 1999–00, 06–07
Ludovic Delporte – Albacete, Osasuna – 2003–10
Moussa Dembélé – Atlético Madrid – 2020–21
Ousmane Dembélé – Barcelona – 2017–
Didier Deschamps – Valencia – 2000–01
Modibo Diakité – Deportivo – 2014–15
Lassana Diarra – Real Madrid – 2008–13
Didier Digard – Betis, Osasuna – 2015–17
Lucas Digne – Barcelona – 2016–18
Näis Djouahra – Real Sociedad – 2019–20
Didier Domi – Espanyol – 2004–06
Marcel Domingo – Atlético Madrid, Espanyol – 1948–51, 52–56
Jean-Félix Dorothée – Valencia – 2002–03
Abdoulaye Doucouré – Granada – 2015–16
Carlos Ducasse – Real Sociedad, Valladolid – 1952–57
Christophe Dugarry – Barcelona – 1997–98
Henry Dumat – Castellón – 1973–74
Richard Dutruel – Celta, Barcelona, Alavés – 1996–03
Daniel Dutuel – Celta, Valladolid – 1996–99
Julien Escudé – Sevilla – 2005–12
Nabil Fekir – Betis – 2019–
Yassin Fekir – Betis – 2022–
Enzo Fernández – Alavés – 2017–18
Mathieu Flamini – Getafe – 2017–19
Kevin Gameiro – Sevilla, Atlético Madrid, Valencia – 2013–21
Ludovic Giuly – Barcelona – 2004–07
Joris Gnagnon – Sevilla – 2018–19
Maxime Gonalons – Sevilla, Granada – 2018–22
Clément Grenier – Mallorca – 2021–
Antoine Griezmann – Real Sociedad, Atlético Madrid, Barcelona – 2010–
Josuha Guilavogui – Atlético Madrid – 2013–14
Haissem Hassan – Villarreal – 2022–
Thierry Henry – Barcelona – 2007–10
Jean-François Hernandez – Compostela, Rayo – 1997–98, 99–00, 01–02
Lucas Hernandez – Atlético Madrid – 2014–19
Theo Hernandez – Alavés, Real Madrid, Real Sociedad – 2016–19
Louis Hon – Real Madrid – 1950–53
Gaëtan Huard – Hércules – 1996–97
Olivier Kapo – Levante – 2006–07
Christian Karembeu – Real Madrid – 1997–00
Koba Koindredi – Valencia – 2020–22
Timothée Kolodziejczak – Sevilla – 2014–17
Abdoulay Konko – Sevilla – 2008–11
Raymond Kopa – Real Madrid – 1956–59
Jules Koundé – Sevilla, Barcelona – 2019–
Aymeric Laporte – Athletic Bilbao – 2012–18
Bertrand Laquait – Recreativo – 2006–07
Benjamin Lecomte – Espanyol – 2022–23
Florian Lejeune – Villarreal, Eibar, Alavés, Rayo – 2011–12, 16–17, 20–
Thomas Lemar – Atlético Madrid – 2018–
Clément Lenglet – Sevilla, Barcelona – 2016–22
Robin Le Normand – Real Sociedad – 2018–
Bixente Lizarazu – Athletic Bilbao – 1996–97
Jordan Lotiès – Osasuna – 2013–14
Peter Luccin – Celta, Atlético Madrid, Zaragoza, Racing – 2001–10
Jean Luciano – Real Madrid, Las Palmas – 1950–52
Péguy Luyindula – Levante – 2006–07
Mickaël Madar – Deportivo – 1996–98
Claude Makélélé – Celta, Real Madrid – 1998–03
Eliaquim Mangala – Valencia – 2016–17, 19–21
Anthony Martial – Sevilla – 2021–22
Jonas Martin – Betis – 2016–17
Corentin Martins – Deportivo – 1996–98
Jérémy Mathieu – Valencia, Barcelona – 2009–17
Florian Maurice – Celta – 2001–02
Rio Mavuba – Villarreal – 2007–08
Houboulang Mendes – Almería – 2022–
Ferland Mendy – Real Madrid – 2019–
Yohan Mollo – Granada – 2011–12
Lucien Muller – Real Madrid, Barcelona – 1962–68
Samir Nasri – Sevilla – 2016–17
Tanguy Nianzou – Sevilla – 2022–
Randy Nteka – Rayo, Elche – 2021–
Steven Nzonzi – Sevilla – 2015–18
Nicolas Ouédec – Espanyol – 1996–98
Noé Pamarot – Hércules, Granada – 2010–12
Fabrice Pancrate – Betis – 2006–07
Franck Passi – Compostela – 1994–98
Jérémy Perbet – Villarreal – 2013–14
Michael Pereira – Mallorca, Granada – 2010–13, 13–14
Emmanuel Petit – Barcelona – 2000–01
René Petit – Real Unión – 1928–32
Ronaël Pierre-Gabriel – Espanyol – 2022–
Stéphane Pignol – Compostela, Numancia, Murcia – 1997–98, 04–05, 07–08
Robert Pires – Villarreal – 2006–10
Lionel Potillon – Real Sociedad – 2003–04
Adil Rami – Valencia, Sevilla – 2011–14, 15–17
René Raphy – Murcia – 1950–51
Loïc Rémy – Las Palmas, Getafe – 2017–18
Anthony Réveillère – Valencia – 2002–03
Emmanuel Rivière – Osasuna – 2016–17
Laurent Robert – Levante – 2006–07
Alain Roche – Valencia – 1998–00
Bruno Rodriguez – Rayo – 2001–02
Eric Roy – Rayo – 2001–02
Modibo Sagnan – Real Sociedad – 2020–21
Yannis Salibur – Mallorca – 2019–20
Matthieu Saunier – Granada – 2016–17
Franck Signorino – Getafe – 2007–10
Florent Sinama Pongolle – Recreativo, Atlético Madrid, Zaragoza – 2006–10, 10–11
Sébastien Squillaci – Sevilla – 2008–10
Ludovic Sylvestre – Barcelona – 2005–06
Franck Tabanou – Granada – 2016–17
Aurélien Tchouaméni – Real Madrid – 2022–
Lilian Thuram – Barcelona – 2006–08
Jean-Clair Todibo – Barcelona – 2018–20
Jérémy Toulalan – Málaga – 2011–13
Benoît Trémoulinas – Sevilla – 2014–17
David Trezeguet – Hércules – 2010–11
Samuel Umtiti – Barcelona – 2016–22
Raphaël Varane – Real Madrid – 2011–21
Laurent Viaud – Extremadura, Albacete – 1998–99, 03–05
Grégory Vignal – Espanyol – 2003–04
Karim Yoda – Getafe – 2014–16
Stéphane Ziani – Deportivo – 1998–99
Luca Zidane – Real Madrid, Rayo – 2017–19, 21–22
Zinedine Zidane – Real Madrid – 2001–06

Georgia 
Shota Arveladze – Levante – 2007–08
Giorgi Demetradze – Real Sociedad – 2000–02
Giorgi Kochorashvili – Levante – 2019–21
Giorgi Mamardashvili – Valencia – 2021–

Germany 

Wolfgang April – Sabadell – 1986–87
Rainer Bonhof – Valencia – 1978–80
Andreas Brehme – Zaragoza – 1992–93
Paul Breitner – Real Madrid – 1974–77
Patrick Ebert – Valladolid, Rayo – 2012–14, 15–16
Dennis Eckert – Celta – 2018–19
Josef Elting – Murcia – 1974–75
Robert Enke – Barcelona – 2002–03
Johannes Geis – Sevilla – 2017–18
Timo Hildebrand – Valencia – 2007–08
Franz Hiller – Elche – 1973–74
Andreas Hinkel – Sevilla – 2006–08
Bodo Illgner – Real Madrid – 1996–00
Sami Khedira – Real Madrid – 2010–15
Jochen Kientz – Logroñés – 1996–97
Toni Kroos – Real Madrid – 2014–
Christian Lell – Levante – 2012–14
Peter Lübeke – Hércules – 1976–77
Marko Marin – Sevilla – 2013–14
Christoph Metzelder – Real Madrid – 2007–10
Shkodran Mustafi – Valencia, Levante – 2014–17, 21–22
Günter Netzer – Real Madrid – 1973–76
Oliver Neuville – Tenerife – 1996–97
David Odonkor – Betis – 2006–09
Mesut Özil – Real Madrid – 2010–14
Gerhard Poschner – Rayo – 1999–01
Antonio Rüdiger – Real Madrid – 2022–
Bernhard "Bernd" Schuster – Barcelona, Real Madrid, Atlético Madrid – 1980–93
Ulrich "Uli" Stielike – Real Madrid – 1977–85
Marc-André ter Stegen – Barcelona – 2014–
Piotr Trochowski – Sevilla – 2011–14
Miroslav "Mirko" Votava – Atlético Madrid – 1982–85
Emil "Emilio" Walter – Barcelona – 1928–31
Heiko Westermann – Betis – 2015–16
Wolfram Wuttke – Espanyol – 1990–92

Greece 
Angelos Basinas – Mallorca – 2005–08
Lampros Choutos – Mallorca – 2005–06
Theofanis Gekas – Levante – 2012–13
Nikolaos Karabelas – Levante – 2012–16
Orestis Karnezis – Granada – 2013–14
Kostas Kiassos – Numancia – 2004–05
Panagiotis Kone – Granada – 2016–17
Leonardo Koutris – Mallorca – 2019–20
Nikos Machlas – Sevilla – 2002–03
Petros Marinakis – Sevilla – 1996–97
Themistoklis "Demis" Nikolaidis – Atlético Madrid – 2003–04
Giourkas Seitaridis – Atlético Madrid – 2006–09
Dimitris Siovas – Leganés, Huesca – 2016–21
Vassilios Tsiartas – Sevilla – 1996–97, 99–00
Alexandros Tziolis – Racing – 2010–12
Loukas Vyntra – Levante – 2012–15

Hungary 

János Aknai – Valencia – 1934–35
Gyula Alberty Kyscel – Real Madrid, Celta, Granada – 1934–36, 39–42
János Beke – Valladolid – 1959–60
Elemér Berkessy – Barcelona – 1934–36
Joseph Csabay – Zaragoza – 1958–60
Josef Csóka – Atlético Madrid – 1958–59
Zoltán Czibor – Barcelona, Espanyol – 1958–62
László Dajka – Las Palmas – 1987–88
János Hrotkó – Zaragoza – 1951–52
Péter Kampfl – Atlético Madrid – 1957–58
László Kaszás – Racing, Espanyol – 1960–61, 63–65
Guillermo Kelemen – Real Madrid – 1935–36
István Kis Szolnok – Espanyol, Mallorca – 1957–61
Sándor Kocsis – Barcelona – 1958–65
László Kubala – Barcelona, Espanyol – 1950–61, 63–64
János Kuszmann – Betis, Espanyol – 1958–66
Attila Ladinsky – Betis – 1975–78
Zsolt Limperger – Real Burgos, Celta – 1991–93, 93–94
Balázs Molnár – Espanyol – 1999–00
Sándor Müller – Hércules – 1981–82
Andrej Prean Nagy – Las Palmas – 1951–52
György Nemes – Real Madrid – 1950–51
Ádám Pintér – Zaragoza – 2010–13
Ferenc Plattkó – Barcelona – 1928–30
Ferenc Puskás – Real Madrid – 1958–66
József Samu – Zaragoza – 1952–53
Béla Sárosi – Zaragoza – 1952–53
Lajos Schróth – Cádiz – 1989–90
Gyula Szabó – Granada – 1959–60
Tibor Szalay – Sevilla, Barcelona, Murcia – 1958–62, 63–64
József Szendrei – Cádiz – 1988–92
Krisztián Vadócz – Osasuna – 2008–11

Iceland 

Alfreð Finnbogason – Real Sociedad – 2014–15
Eiður Guðjohnsen – Barcelona – 2006–09
Joey Guðjónsson – Betis – 2001–03
Þórður Guðjónsson – Las Palmas – 2000–01
Sverrir Ingi Ingason – Granada – 2016–17
Pétur Pétursson – Hércules – 1985–86

Israel 

Omri Afek – Racing – 2003–04
Dudu Aouate – Racing, Deportivo, Mallorca – 2003–13
Omer Atzili – Granada – 2016–17
Ilan Bakhar – Racing – 2002–03
Yossi Benayoun – Racing – 2002–05
Mu'nas Dabbur – Sevilla – 2019–20
Ronen Harazi – Salamanca – 1997–98
Tomer Hemed – Mallorca, Almería – 2011–13, 14–15
Avi Nimni – Atlético Madrid – 1997–98
Haim Revivo – Celta – 1996–00
Ben Sahar – Espanyol – 2009–10
Idan Tal – Rayo – 2002–03
Shon Weissman – Valladolid – 2020–21, 22–23

Italy 

Christian Abbiati – Atlético Madrid – 2007–08
Robert Acquafresca – Levante – 2012–13
Demetrio Albertini – Atlético Madrid, Barcelona – 2002–03, 04–05
Marco Andreolli – Sevilla – 2015–16
Alberto Aquilani – Las Palmas – 2017–18
Federico Barba – Valladolid – 2019–20
Nicola Berti – Alavés – 1998–99
Cristiano Biraghi – Granada – 2015–16
Angelo Bollano – Murcia – 1950–51
Daniele Bonera – Villarreal – 2015–19
Alberto Brignoli – Leganés – 2016–17
Aridex Calligaris – Real Sociedad – 1949–50
Fabio Cannavaro – Real Madrid – 2006–09
Amedeo Carboni – Valencia – 1997–06
Antonio Cassano – Real Madrid – 2005–07
Paolo Castellini – Betis – 2004–06
Alessio Cerci – Atlético Madrid – 2014–15, 16–17
Bruno Cirillo – Levante – 2007–08
Luca Cigarini – Sevilla – 2010–11
Francesco Coco – Barcelona – 2001–02
Matteo Contini – Zaragoza – 2009–11
Bernardo Corradi – Valencia – 2004–05
Patrick Cutrone – Valencia – 2020–21
Sergio Del Pinto – Lleida – 1950–51
Morgan De Sanctis – Sevilla – 2007–08
Marco Di Vaio – Valencia – 2004–06
Cristiano Doni – Mallorca – 2005–06
Stefano Fiore – Valencia – 2004–05
Alessandro Florenzi – Valencia – 2019–20
Antonio Floro Flores – Granada – 2012–13
Fernando Forestieri – Málaga – 2009–10
Tiberio Guarente – Sevilla – 2010–12
Ciro Immobile – Sevilla – 2015–16
Mark Iuliano – Mallorca – 2004–06
Marco Lanna – Salamanca, Zaragoza – 1997–01
Maurizio Lanzaro – Zaragoza – 2010–13
Damiano Longhi – Hércules – 1996–97
Samuele Longo – Espanyol, Rayo, Huesca – 2012–13, 13–14, 18–19
Cristiano Lucarelli – Valencia – 1998–99
Luiz Felipe – Betis – 2022–
Enzo Maresca – Sevilla, Málaga – 2005–09, 10–12
Emiliano Moretti – Valencia – 2004–09
Thiago Motta – Barcelona, Atlético Madrid – 2001–08
Daniel Osvaldo – Espanyol – 2009–11
Christian Panucci – Real Madrid – 1996–99
Giampaolo Pazzini – Levante – 2017–18
Cristiano Piccini – Betis, Valencia – 2015–17, 18–20, 20–22
Alessandro Pierini – Racing – 2004–05
Federico Piovaccari – Eibar – 2014–15
Alessandro Potenza – Mallorca – 2005–06
Vincenzo Rennella – Betis – 2015–16
Christian Riganò – Levante – 2007–08
Fausto Rossi – Valladolid, Córdoba – 2013–15
Giuseppe Rossi – Villarreal, Levante, Celta – 2007–12, 15–16, 16–17
Nicola Sansone – Villarreal – 2016–19
Michele Serena – Atlético Madrid – 1998–99
Salvatore Sirigu – Sevilla, Osasuna – 2016–17
Roberto Soriano – Villarreal – 2016–18
Stefano Sorrentino – Recreativo – 2007–08
Marco Storari – Levante – 2007–08
Alessio Tacchinardi – Villarreal – 2005–07
Francesco Tavano – Valencia – 2006–07
Damiano Tommasi – Levante – 2006–08
Moreno Torricelli – Espanyol – 2002–04
Stefano Torrisi – Atlético Madrid – 1998–99
Giorgio Venturin – Atlético Madrid – 1998–00
Daniele Verde – Valladolid – 2018–19
Simone Verdi – Eibar – 2015–16
Christian Vieri – Atlético Madrid – 1997–98
Gianluca Zambrotta – Barcelona – 2006–08
Simone Zaza – Valencia – 2016–18

Kosovo 
Vedat Muriqi – Mallorca – 2021–

Latvia 
Māris Verpakovskis – Getafe – 2006–07

Lithuania 
Giedrius Arlauskis – Espanyol – 2015–16
Edgaras Jankauskas – Real Sociedad – 1999–02
Marius Stankevičius – Sevilla, Valencia – 2009–11

Montenegro 

Branko Brnović – Espanyol – 1994–00 –  while active.
Andrija Delibašić – Mallorca, Rayo – 2003–05, 11–13 –  while active.
Ardian Đokaj – Mallorca – 1999–00 –  while active.
Borislav Đurović – Valladolid – 1980–81 –  while active.
Igor Gluščević – Extremadura – 1996–97 –  while active.
Stevan Jovetić – Sevilla – 2016–17
Miodrag Kustudić – Hércules – 1978–81 –  while active.
Predrag Mijatović – Valencia, Real Madrid – 1993–99 –  while active.
Milutin Osmajić – Cádiz – 2021–22
Željko Petrović – Sevilla – 1991–92 –  while active.
Vladimir Popović – Sporting – 1997–98 –  while active.
Esteban Saveljich – Rayo – 2021–
Stefan Savić – Atlético Madrid – 2015–
Nebojša Šćepanović – Oviedo – 1995–96 –  while active.
Nikola Vujadinović – Osasuna – 2016–17
Nikola Vukčević – Levante – 2018–22

Netherlands 

Yassine Abdellaoui – Rayo – 1996–97
Bobby Adekanye – Cádiz – 2020–21
Ibrahim Afellay – Barcelona – 2010–12, 13–14
Ryan Babel – Deportivo – 2016–17
Dave van den Bergh – Rayo – 1999–00
Kevin Bobson – Espanyol – 2003–04
Frank de Boer – Barcelona – 1998–03
Ronald de Boer – Barcelona – 1998–00
Michel Boerebach – Real Burgos – 1992–93
Winston Bogarde – Barcelona – 1997–00
Mark van Bommel – Barcelona – 2005–06
Khalid Boulahrouz – Sevilla – 2007–08
Giovanni van Bronckhorst – Barcelona – 2003–07
Arnold Bruggink – Mallorca – 2003–04
Jasper Cillessen – Barcelona, Valencia – 2016–22
Phillip Cocu – Barcelona – 1998–04
Jürgen Colin – Sporting – 2008–09
Johan Cruyff – Barcelona – 1973–78
Jordi Cruyff – Barcelona, Celta, Alavés, Espanyol – 1994–96, 98–99, 00–04
Arnaut Danjuma – Villarreal – 2021–23
Edgar Davids – Barcelona – 2003–04
Memphis Depay – Barcelona, Atlético Madrid – 2021–
Dick van Dijk – Murcia – 1974–75
Royston Drenthe – Real Madrid, Hércules – 2007–11
Jonathan de Guzmán – Mallorca, Villarreal – 2010–12
Jimmy Floyd Hasselbaink – Atlético Madrid – 1999–00
John Heitinga – Atlético Madrid – 2008–09
Ruud Hesp – Barcelona – 1997–00
Wesley Hoedt – Celta – 2018–19
Rick Hoogendorp – Celta – 1999–00
Klaas-Jan Huntelaar – Real Madrid – 2008–09
Ola John – Deportivo – 2016–17
Frenkie de Jong – Barcelona – 2019–
Luuk de Jong – Sevilla, Barcelona – 2019–22
Justin Kluivert – Valencia – 2022–
Patrick Kluivert – Barcelona, Valencia – 1998–04, 05–06
Ronald Koeman – Barcelona – 1989–95
Jan Kromkamp – Villarreal – 2005–06
Glenn Loovens – Zaragoza – 2012–13
Hedwiges Maduro – Valencia, Sevilla – 2007–13
Roy Makaay – Tenerife, Deportivo – 1997–03
Joris Mathijsen – Málaga – 2011–12
John Metgod – Real Madrid – 1982–84
Gerrie Mühren – Betis – 1976–78
Kizito "Kiki" Musampa – Málaga, Atlético Madrid – 1999–05
Riga Mustapha – Levante – 2006–08
Johan Neeskens – Barcelona – 1974–79
Ruud van Nistelrooy – Real Madrid, Málaga – 2006–10, 11–12
Tarik Oulida – Sevilla – 1995–97
Marc Overmars – Barcelona – 2000–04
René Ponk – Compostela – 1997–98
Quincy Promes – Sevilla – 2018–19
Michael Reiziger – Barcelona – 1997–04
Karim Rekik – Sevilla – 2020–
Johnny Rep – Valencia – 1975–77
Daniël de Ridder – Celta – 2005–07
Frank Rijkaard – Zaragoza – 1987–88
Arjen Robben – Real Madrid – 2007–09
Clarence Seedorf – Real Madrid – 1996–00
Wesley Sneijder – Real Madrid – 2007–09
Rafael van der Vaart – Real Madrid, Betis – 2008–10, 15–16
Piet Velthuizen – Hércules – 2010–11
Ferdi Vierklau – Tenerife – 1997–99
Tonny Vilhena – Espanyol – 2021–22
Sander Westerveld – Real Sociedad, Mallorca – 2001–05
Faas Wilkes – Valencia – 1953–56
Richard Witschge – Barcelona, Alavés – 1991–93, 01–02
Ricky van Wolfswinkel – Betis – 2015–16
Nordin Wooter – Zaragoza – 1997–99
Boudewijn Zenden – Barcelona – 1998–01
Gianni Zuiverloon – Mallorca – 2011–12

North Macedonia 
Enis Bardhi – Levante – 2017–22
Stole Dimitrievski – Granada, Rayo – 2014–15, 18–19, 21–
Dragan Kanatlarovski – Deportivo – 1991–92
Blagoja Kitanovski – Sabadell – 1987–88 –  while active.
Ilija Najdoski – Valladolid – 1993–94
Mitko Stojkovski – Oviedo – 1995–97
Aleksandar Trajkovski – Mallorca – 2019–20

Northern Ireland 
Gerry Armstrong – Mallorca – 1983–84
Jim Hagan – Celta – 1987–89

Norway 
Jan Berg – Elche, Rayo – 1988–90
John Carew – Valencia – 2000–03
Vadim Demidov – Real Sociedad, Celta – 2010–12, 12–13
Dan Eggen – Celta, Alavés – 1997–03
Bjørn Tore Kvarme – Real Sociedad – 2001–04
Martin Ødegaard – Real Madrid, Real Sociedad – 2014–15, 19–21
Frode Olsen – Sevilla – 1999–00, 01–02
Knut Olav Rindarøy – Deportivo – 2010–11
Sigurd Rushfeldt – Racing – 1999–01
Alexander Sørloth – Real Sociedad – 2021–22, 22–
Jørgen Strand Larsen – Celta – 2022–

Poland 

Wolfgang April – Sabadell – 1986–87
Jerzy Dudek – Real Madrid – 2007–11
Dariusz Dudka – Levante – 2012–13
Damian Kądzior – Eibar – 2020–21
Roman Kosecki – Osasuna, Atlético Madrid – 1992–95
Wojciech Kowalczyk – Betis – 1994–97
Grzegorz Krychowiak – Sevilla – 2014–16
Cezary Kucharski – Sporting – 1997–98
Grzegorz Lewandowski – Logroñés – 1993–94
Robert Lewandowski – Barcelona – 2022–
Bartłomiej Pawłowski – Málaga – 2013–14
Damien Perquis – Betis – 2012–14
Eugen Polanski – Getafe – 2008–09
Jerzy Podbrożny – Mérida – 1997–98
Euzebiusz "Ebi" Smolarek – Racing – 2007–08
Ryszard Staniek – Osasuna – 1993–94
Jan Tomaszewski – Hércules – 1981–82
Mirosław Trzeciak – Osasuna – 2000–01
Przemysław Tytoń – Elche, Deportivo – 2014–15, 16–18
Jan Urban – Osasuna, Valladolid – 1989–95
Cezary Wilk – Deportivo – 2014–15
Jacek Ziober – Osasuna – 1993–94

Portugal 

Abel Xavier – Oviedo – 1996–98
Agostinho – Málaga – 1999–01
André Almeida – Valencia – 2022–
André Castro – Sporting – 2010–12
André Gomes – Valencia, Barcelona – 2014–18
André Santos – Deportivo – 2012–13
André Silva – Sevilla – 2018–19
António Oliveira – Betis – 1979–80
Ariza Makukula – Valladolid, Sevilla, Gimnàstic – 2003–05, 06–07
Bakero – Sevilla – 1999–00
Beto – Recreativo – 2006–09
Beto – Sevilla – 2012–16
Bino – Tenerife – 2001–02
Bruma – Real Sociedad – 2015–16
Bruno Caires – Celta – 1997–00
Bruno Gama – Deportivo – 2012–13, 16–18
Carlos Gomes – Granada, Oviedo – 1958–61
Carlos Martins – Recreativo, Granada – 2007–08, 11–12
Carlos Secretário – Real Madrid – 1996–97
Carlos Xavier – Real Sociedad – 1991–94
César Brito – Salamanca – 1997–98
Chaínho – Zaragoza – 2001–02
Costinha – Atlético Madrid – 2006–07
Cristiano Ronaldo – Real Madrid – 2009–18
Dani – Atlético Madrid – 2002–03
Daniel Candeias – Granada – 2014–15
Daniel Carriço – Sevilla – 2013–20
Deco – Barcelona – 2004–08
Dino – Salamanca – 1998–99
Diogo Figueiras – Sevilla – 2013–15, 15–16
Diogo Salomão – Deportivo – 2012–13, 14–15
Domingos – Tenerife – 1997–99
Domingos Duarte – Granada, Getafe – 2019–
Domingos Quina – Granada, Elche – 2020–21, 22–23
Duda – Málaga, Sevilla – 2001–02, 03–17
Dyego Sousa – Almería – 2022–
Edgar – Málaga – 1999–03, 03–06
Edinho – Málaga – 2009–11
Edmundo Graça – Sevilla – 1958–59
Eliseu – Málaga, Zaragoza – 2008–09, 09–14
Emílio Peixe – Sevilla – 1995–96
Espinho – Málaga – 2015–16
Fábio Coentrão – Real Madrid – 2011–15, 16–17
Fábio Felício – Real Sociedad – 2006–07
Fernando Couto – Barcelona – 1996–98
Fernando Gomes – Sporting – 1980–82
Fernando Meira – Zaragoza – 2011–12
Ferro – Valencia – 2020–21
Flávio Ferreira – Málaga – 2013–16
Florentino Luís – Getafe – 2021–
Francisco Trincão – Barcelona – 2020–21
Francisco Vital – Betis – 1979–80
Gelson Martins – Atlético Madrid – 2018–19
Gil Dias – Granada – 2019–20
Gomes Bravo – Real Sociedad – 1947–48, 49–50
Gonçalo Guedes – Valencia – 2017–22
Gonçalo Paciência – Celta – 2022–
Guilherme Guedes – Almería – 2022–
Hélder Baptista – Rayo – 1999–05
Hélder Cristóvão – Deportivo – 1996–98, 00–02
Hélder Lopes – Las Palmas – 2016–17
Hélder Postiga – Zaragoza, Valencia, Deportivo – 2011–14, 14–15
Hélder Rosário – Málaga – 2008–11
Henrique Sereno – Valladolid – 2012–13
Hernâni – Levante – 2019–20
Hugo Leal – Atlético Madrid – 1999–00
Hugo Porfírio – Racing – 1997–98
Hugo Viana – Valencia, Osasuna – 2005–09
Ivan Cavaleiro – Deportivo – 2014–15
João Alves – Salamanca – 1976–78
João Cancelo – Valencia – 2014–17
João Félix – Atlético Madrid – 2019–23
João Pereira – Valencia – 2012–14
João Tomás – Betis – 2001–03
Jordão – Zaragoza – 1976–77
Jorge Andrade – Deportivo – 2002–07
Jorge Cadete – Celta – 1997–99
Jorge Gonçalves – Racing – 2008–09
Jorge Ribeiro – Málaga – 2005–06
José Calado – Betis – 2001–03
José Nunes – Mallorca – 2005–13
Jota – Valladolid – 2020–21
Kévin Rodrigues – Real Sociedad, Leganés, Eibar, Rayo – 2016–22
Licá – Rayo – 2014–15
Litos – Málaga – 2001–06
Luís Figo – Barcelona, Real Madrid – 1995–05
Luisinho – Deportivo, Huesca – 2014–19, 20–21
Luís Martins – Granada – 2014–15, 16–17
Luís Maximiano – Granada – 2021–22
Maniche – Atlético Madrid – 2006–08, 08–09
Manuel Fernandes – Valencia – 2007–08, 08–11
Marco Caneira – Valencia – 2004–06, 07–08
Mário Silva – Cádiz – 2005–06
Miguel – Valencia – 2005–12
Miguel Areias – Celta – 2006–07
Miguel Cardoso – Deportivo – 2015–16
Miguel Lopes – Granada – 2015–16
Nani – Valencia – 2016–17
Nélson Marcos – Betis, Osasuna, Almería – 2008–09, 10–13, 13–14
Nélson Oliveira – Deportivo – 2012–13
Nélson Semedo – Barcelona – 2017–20
Nuno – Deportivo, Osasuna – 1996–98, 00–02
Nuno Luís – Salamanca – 1998–99
Oceano – Real Sociedad – 1991–94
Pauleta – Salamanca, Deportivo – 1997–00
Paulo Bento – Oviedo – 1996–00
Paulo Futre – Atlético Madrid – 1987–93, 97–98
Paulo Oliveira – Eibar – 2017–21
Paulo Sousa – Espanyol – 2001–02
Paulo Torres – Salamanca – 1997–98
Pepe – Real Madrid – 2007–17
Pizzi – Atlético Madrid, Deportivo, Espanyol – 2011–14
 – Deportivo – 1942–46
Quinito – Racing – 1975–78
Rafa Soares – Eibar – 2019–21
Ricardo Carvalho – Real Madrid – 2010–13
Ricardo Costa – Valencia, Granada – 2010–14, 15–16
Ricardo Horta – Málaga – 2014–16
Ricardo Pereira – Betis – 2007–09
Ricardo Quaresma – Barcelona – 2003–04
Ricardo Sá Pinto – Real Sociedad – 1997–00
Rogerio – Salamanca – 1997–99
Rony Lopes – Sevilla – 2019–20
Rúben Micael – Zaragoza – 2011–12
Rúben Semedo – Villarreal, Huesca – 2017–19
Rúben Vezo – Valencia, Granada, Levante – 2013–22
Rui Fonte – Espanyol – 2010–13
Rui Silva – Granada, Betis – 2019–
Samú Costa – Almería – 2022–
Silvestre Varela – Recreativo – 2007–08
Sílvio – Atlético Madrid, Deportivo – 2011–13
Simão – Barcelona, Atlético Madrid, Espanyol – 1999–01, 07–11, 12–14
José Taira – Salamanca – 1997–99
Thierry Correia – Valencia – 2019–
Tiago – Atlético Madrid – 2009–17
Tiago Ilori – Granada – 2013–14
Tiago Gomes – Hércules – 2010–11
Tomás Tavares – Alavés – 2020–21
Tulipa – Salamanca – 1997–98
Victoriano Bastos – Zaragoza – 1975–77
Vítor Baía – Barcelona – 1996–99
Vítor Damas – Racing – 1976–79
Vitorino Antunes – Málaga, Getafe – 2012–15, 17–20
William Carvalho – Betis – 2018–
Zé Castro – Atlético Madrid, Deportivo, Rayo – 2006–11, 12–16

Republic of Ireland 
John Aldridge – Real Sociedad – 1989–91
Liam Buckley – Racing – 1986–87
Alan Campbell – Racing – 1984–86
Matt Doherty – Atlético Madrid – 2022–
John Patrick Finn – Getafe – 2020–21
Steve Finnan – Espanyol – 2008–09
Ashley Grimes – Osasuna – 1989–90
Ian Harte – Levante – 2004–05, 06–07
Kevin Moran – Sporting – 1988–90
Michael Robinson – Osasuna – 1986–89

Romania 

Florin Andone – Córdoba, Deportivo, Cádiz – 2014–15, 16–18, 21–22
Gavril Balint – Real Burgos – 1990–93
Constantin Barbu – Numancia – 1999–01
Miodrag Belodedici – Valencia, Valladolid – 1992–95
Cosmin Contra – Alavés, Atlético Madrid, Getafe – 1999–01, 02–04, 05–10
Gică Craioveanu – Real Sociedad, Villarreal, Getafe – 1995–99, 00–02, 04–06
Ilie Dumitrescu – Sevilla – 1994–95
Iulian Filipescu – Betis – 1998–00, 01–03
Constantin Gâlcă – Espanyol, Villarreal – 1997–03
Cristian Ganea – Athletic Bilbao – 2018–19
Gheorghe Hagi – Real Madrid, Barcelona – 1990–92, 94–96
Adrian Ilie – Valencia, Alavés – 1997–03
Marius Iordache – Villarreal – 1998–99
Marius Lăcătuș – Oviedo – 1991–93
Silviu Lung – Logroñés – 1990–91
Bogdan Mara – Alavés – 2001–03
Ciprian Marica  – Getafe – 2013–14
Lucian Marinescu – Salamanca – 1998–99
Dorin Mateuț – Zaragoza – 1990–93
Cătălin Munteanu – Salamanca, Espanyol, Albacete – 1998–99, 01–02, 03–04
Costel Pantilimon – Deportivo – 2017–18
Gabriel Popescu – Salamanca, Valencia, Numancia – 1997–00
Gheorghe Popescu – Barcelona – 1995–97
Daniel Prodan – Atlético Madrid – 1996–98
Cristian Pulhac – Hércules – 2010–11
Claudiu Răducanu – Espanyol – 2003–04
Florin Răducioiu – Espanyol – 1994–96, 96–97
Răzvan Raț – Rayo – 2013–14, 15–16
Laurențiu Roșu – Numancia, Recreativo – 2000–01, 06–08
Raul Rusescu – Sevilla – 2013–14
Marcel Sabou – Tenerife, Sporting – 1990–91, 93–96
Cristian Săpunaru – Zaragoza, Elche – 2012–14
László Sepsi – Racing – 2008–10
Dennis Șerban – Valencia – 1998–00, 01–02
Nicolae Simatoc – Barcelona, Oviedo – 1950–53
Bogdan Stelea – Mallorca, Salamanca – 1991–92, 97–99
Ovidiu Stîngă – Salamanca – 1995–96
Gabriel Tamaș – Celta – 2006–07
Alexandru Țîrlea – Alavés – 2021–22
Gabriel Torje – Granada, Espanyol – 2012–14
Alin Toșca – Betis – 2016–18

Russia 

Vladimir Beschastnykh – Racing – 1996–01
Denis Cheryshev – Sevilla, Villarreal, Real Madrid, Valencia – 2013–22
Dmitri Cheryshev – Sporting – 1996–98
Rinat Dasaev – Sevilla – 1988–90 –  while active.
Igor Dobrovolski – Castellón, Atlético Madrid – 1990–91, 94–95 –  while active.
Ilshat Fayzulin – Racing – 1995–97
Dmitri Galyamin – Espanyol – 1991–93 –  while active.
Nikita Iosifov – Villarreal – 2021–
Valeri Karpin – Real Sociedad, Valencia, Celta – 1994–05
Aleksandr Kerzhakov – Sevilla – 2006–08
Dmitri Khokhlov – Real Sociedad – 1999–03
Igor Korneev – Espanyol, Barcelona – 1991–93, 94–95 –  while active.
Aleksei Kosolapov – Sporting – 1997–98
Dmitri Kuznetsov – Espanyol – 1991–93, 94–95 –  while active.
Igor Lediakhov – Sporting – 1994–98
Andrei Moj – Espanyol, Hércules – 1991–93, 96–97 –  while active.
Aleksandr Mostovoi – Celta – 1996–04
Yuri Nikiforov – Sporting – 1996–98
Viktor Onopko – Oviedo, Rayo – 1995–01, 02–03
Nikolai Pisarev – Mérida – 1995–96
Evgeni Plotnikov – Albacete – 1996–97
Dmitri Popov – Racing, Compostela – 1993–98
Dmitri Radchenko – Racing, Deportivo, Rayo, Mérida – 1993–98
Vladislav Radimov – Zaragoza – 1996–00
Oleg Salenko – Logroñés, Valencia – 1992–95
Edgar Sevikyan – Levante – 2020–21
Sergei Shustikov – Racing – 1996–97, 98–00
Igor Simutenkov – Tenerife – 2001–02
Fyodor Smolov – Celta – 2019–20
Dmitri Ulyanov – Racing – 1996–97

Scotland 
Steve Archibald – Barcelona – 1984–87
Oliver Burke – Alavés – 2019–20
Jordan Holsgrove – Celta – 2020–21
Alan Hutton – Mallorca – 2012–13
Ted McMinn – Sevilla – 1987–88
John Fox Watson – Real Madrid – 1948–49

Serbia 

Ivan Adžić – Logroñés – 1996–97 –  while active.
Miodrag Anđelković – Espanyol – 1996–97 –  while active.
Radomir Antić – Zaragoza – 1978–80 –  while active.
Aleksandar Aranđelović – Atlético Madrid – 1952–53 –  while active.
Srđan Babić – Almería – 2022–
Stefan Babović – Zaragoza – 2012–13
Srđan Bajčetić – Celta – 1994–97 –  while active.
Goran Bogdanović – Espanyol, Extremadura – 1995–97, 98–99 –  while active.
Rade Bogdanović – Atlético Madrid – 1997–98 –  while active.
Darko Brašanac – Betis, Leganés, Alavés, Osasuna – 2016–
Rajko Brežančić – Huesca – 2018–19
Miloš Bursać – Celta – 1992–93 –  while active.
Goran Čaušić – Osasuna – 2016–17
Željko Cicović – Las Palmas – 2000–02 –  while active.
Dragan Ćirić – Barcelona, Valladolid – 1997–99, 00–04 –  while active.
Vladimir Ćulafić – Cádiz – 1981–82 –  while active.
Vladan Dimitrijević – Albacete – 1993–94 –  while active.
Milovan Đorić – Oviedo – 1973–74 –  while active.
Goran Đorović – Celta, Deportivo – 1997–03 –  while active.
Miroslav Đukić – Deportivo, Valencia – 1991–03 – – while active.
Marko Dmitrović – Eibar, Sevilla – 2017–
Ivica Dragutinović – Sevilla – 2005–11
Dejan Dražić – Celta – 2015–16
Miloš Drizić – Rayo – 1989–90 –  while active.
Goran Drulić – Zaragoza – 2001–02, 03–05 –  while active.
Ratomir Dujković – Oviedo – 1975–76 –  while active.
Ljubomir Fejsa – Alavés – 2019–20
Nemanja Gudelj – Sevilla – 2019–
Saša Ilić – Celta – 2003–04 –  while active.
Dragan Isailović – Valladolid – 1998–00 –  while active.
Boško Janković – Mallorca – 2006–07
Milan Janković – Real Madrid – 1986–88 –  while active.
Slaviša Jokanović – Oviedo, Tenerife, Deportivo – 1993–00 –  while active.
Aleksandar Jovanović – Huesca – 2018–19
Luka Jović – Real Madrid – 2019–21, 21–22
Vladimir Jugović – Atlético Madrid – 1998–99 –  while active.
Dragi Kaličanin – Zaragoza – 1985–86 –  while active.
Atila Kasaš – Logroñés – 1994–95 –  while active.
Aleksandar Katai – Alavés – 2016–18
Ilija Katić – Burgos – 1976–77 –  while active.
Mateja Kežman – Atlético Madrid – 2005–06 –  while active.
Slobodan Komljenović – Zaragoza – 2001–02 –  while active.
Bogdan Korać – Murcia – 1987–89 –  while active.
Darko Kovačević – Real Sociedad – 1996–99, 01–07 –  while active.
Nenad Krstičić – Alavés – 2016–17
Vladan Kujović – Levante – 2007–08
Zdravko Kuzmanović – Málaga – 2016–18
Dejan Lekić – Osasuna, Eibar – 2010–12, 14–15
Dragoje Leković – Sporting – 1997–98 –  while active.
Saša Lukić – Levante – 2017–18
Vladan Lukić – Atlético Madrid – 1992–93 –  while active.
Nemanja Maksimović – Valencia, Getafe – 2017–
Filip Malbašić – Cádiz – 2020–21
Nikola Maraš – Rayo – 2021–22
Zoran Marić – Celta – 1987–90 –  while active.
Dejan Marković – Logroñés – 1993–95, 96–97 –  while active.
Milan Martinović – Oviedo – 2000–01 –  while active.
Božur Matejić – Castellón – 1990–91 –  while active.
Zlatomir Mićanović – Salamanca, Málaga – 1983–85 –  while active.
Duško Milinković – Osasuna – 1988–89 –  while active.
Nemanja Miljanović – Hércules, Salamanca – 1996–97, 97–98 –  while active.
Goran Milojević – Mallorca, Celta – 1991–92, 95–96 – – while active.
Goran Milošević – Espanyol – 1997–99 –  while active.
Savo Milošević – Zaragoza, Espanyol, Celta, Osasuna – 1998–00, 01–07 –  while active.
Branko Milovanović – Deportivo – 1995–96 –  while active.
Marko Milovanović – Almería – 2022–
Nenad Mirosavljević – Cádiz – 2005–06 –  while active.
Stefan Mitrović – Valladolid, Getafe – 2013–14, 21–
Dragan Mladenović – Real Sociedad – 2004–05 –  while active.
Albert Nađ – Betis, Oviedo – 1996–01 –  while active.
Matija Nastasić – Mallorca – 2022–
Zoran Njeguš – Atlético Madrid, Sevilla – 1998–00, 01–04 –  while active.
Ivan Obradović – Zaragoza – 2009–13
Perica Ognjenović – Real Madrid – 1998–01 –  while active.
Aleksandar Pantić – Villarreal, Córdoba, Eibar, Alavés – 2013–17
Milinko Pantić – Atlético Madrid – 1995–98 –  while active.
Veljko Paunović – Atlético Madrid, Mallorca, Oviedo, Getafe, Almería – 1996–02, 03–05, 05–08 –  while active.
Dejan Petković – Real Madrid, Sevilla, Racing – 1995–97 –  while active.
Njegoš Petrović – Granada – 2021–22
Dragomir Racić – Castellón – 1981–82 –  while active.
Uroš Račić – Valencia – 2020–22
Nemanja Radoja – Celta, Levante – 2014–18, 19–22
Predrag Rajković – Mallorca – 2022–
Antonio Rukavina – Valladolid, Villarreal – 2012–18
Ivan Šaponjić – Atlético Madrid, Cádiz – 2019–21
Goran Šaula – Compostela – 1996–98 –  while active.
Dušan Savić – Sporting – 1982–83 –  while active.
Stefan Šćepović – Getafe – 2015–16
Aleksandar Sedlar – Mallorca – 2019–20, 21–22
Milan Smiljanić – Espanyol, Sporting – 2007–10
Predrag Spasić – Real Madrid, Osasuna – 1990–94 – – while active.
Jovan Stanković – Mallorca, Atlético Madrid – 1997–01, 02–04 –  while active.
Predrag Stanković – Hércules – 1996–97 –  while active.
Milan Stepanov – Málaga – 2009–10
Goran Stevanović – Osasuna – 1991–93 – – while active.
Zoran Stojadinović – Mallorca, Deportivo – 1989–90, 91–92 – – while active.
Vlada Stošić – Mallorca, Betis – 1991–92, 94–96 – – while active.
Vladimir Stojković – Getafe – 2008–09
Igor Taševski – Villarreal – 1998–99, 00–01 –  while active.
Đorđe Tomić – Atlético Madrid, Oviedo – 1996–97, 00–01 –  while active.
Ivan Tomić – Alavés – 2000–01, 02–03 –  while active.
Duško Tošić – Betis – 2011–12
Petar Vasiljević – Albacete – 1995–96 –  while active.
Vladimir Vermezović – Sporting – 1989–90 –  while active.
Risto Vidaković – Betis, Osasuna – 1994–01 –  while active.
Josip Višnjić – Rayo, Hércules – 1992–94, 96–97 –  while active.
Miroslav Vojinović – Cádiz – 1983–84 –  while active.
Nikola Žigić – Racing, Valencia – 2006–10

Slovakia 
Peter Dubovský – Real Madrid, Oviedo – 1993–00
Dušan Galis – Cádiz – 1981–82 –  while active.
Dominik Greif – Mallorca – 2021–
Miroslav Karhan – Betis – 1999–00
Marián Kelemen – Numancia – 2008–09
Branislav Kubala – Espanyol – 1964–65 –  while active.
Stanislav Lobotka – Celta – 2017–20
Milan Luhový – Sporting – 1989–92 –  while active.
Róbert Mazáň – Celta – 2017–19
Tibor Mičinec – Logroñés – 1991–92 –  while active.
Ján Pivarník – Cádiz – 1981–82 –  while active.
Samuel Slovák – Tenerife – 1997–99, 01–02
Martin Šviderský – Almería – 2022–
Martin Valjent – Mallorca – 2019–20, 21–
Denis Vavro – Huesca – 2020–21
Vladimír Weiss – Espanyol – 2011–12

Slovenia 

Branko Ilić – Betis – 2006–09
Bojan Jokić – Villarreal – 2013–16
Rene Krhin – Córdoba, Granada – 2014–17
Jan Oblak – Atlético Madrid – 2014–
Dalibor Stevanovič – Real Sociedad – 2005–07
Zlatko Zahovič – Valencia – 2000–01

Sweden 

Bengt Andersson – Tenerife – 1996–98
Patrik Andersson – Barcelona – 2001–04
Sanny Åslund – Espanyol – 1974–75
Mattias Asper – Real Sociedad – 2000–01
Ludwig Augustinsson – Sevilla, Mallorca – 2021–22, 22–
Kennedy Bakircioglu – Racing – 2010–12
Joachim Björklund – Valencia – 1998–01
Henry Carlsson – Atlético Madrid – 1949–53
Omar Faraj – Levante – 2021–22
Tobias Grahn – Gimnàstic – 2006–07
John Guidetti – Celta, Alavés – 2015–20, 20–22
Zlatan Ibrahimović – Barcelona – 2009–10
Alexander Isak – Real Sociedad – 2019–23
Daniel Larsson – Valladolid, Granada – 2012–15
Henrik Larsson – Barcelona – 2004–06
Olof Mellberg – Racing – 1998–01
Håkan Mild – Real Sociedad – 1996–98
Johan Mjällby – Levante – 2004–05
Guillermo Molins – Betis – 2012–13
Joakim Nilsson – Sporting – 1990–93
Markus Rosenberg – Racing – 2010–11
Stefan Schwarz – Valencia – 1998–99
Agne Simonsson – Real Madrid, Real Sociedad – 1960–62
Kari Juhani "Gary" Sundgren – Zaragoza – 1997–02
Williot Swedberg – Celta – 2022–
Christian Wilhelmsson – Deportivo – 2007–08

Switzerland 
Fabio Celestini – Levante, Getafe – 2004–10
Fabio Coltorti – Racing – 2007–11
Eray Cömert – Valencia – 2021–
Xavier Margairaz – Osasuna – 2007–08
Patrick Müller – Mallorca – 2004–05
Alain Nef – Recreativo – 2008–09
Fabian Schär – Deportivo – 2017–18
Haris Seferovic – Real Sociedad, Celta – 2013–14, 22–
Philippe Senderos – Valencia – 2013–14
Johann Vogel – Betis – 2006–07

Turkey 

Hamit Altıntop – Real Madrid – 2011–12
Emre Belözoğlu – Atlético Madrid – 2012–13
Emre Çolak – Deportivo – 2016–18
Oktay Derelioğlu – Las Palmas – 2000–01
Arif Erdem – Real Sociedad – 2000–01
Serdar Gürler – Huesca – 2018–19
Nihat Kahveci – Real Sociedad, Villarreal – 2001–09
İbrahim Kaş – Getafe – 2008–09
Tayfun Korkut – Real Sociedad, Espanyol – 2000–04
İsmail Köybaşı – Granada – 2019–20
Ersen Martin – Recreativo – 2007–09
Mehmet Aurélio – Betis – 2008–09
Emre Mor – Celta – 2017–19, 20–21
Cenk Özkacar – Valencia – 2022–
Rüştü Reçber – Barcelona – 2003–04
Nuri Şahin – Real Madrid – 2011–12
Mehmet Topal – Valencia – 2010–12
Arda Turan – Atlético Madrid, Barcelona – 2011–17
Enes Ünal – Villarreal, Levante, Valladolid, Getafe – 2017–
Okay Yokuşlu – Celta, Getafe – 2018–21, 21–22

Ukraine 
Denys Boyko – Málaga – 2016–17
Dmytro Chyhrynskyi – Barcelona – 2009–10
Yevhen Konoplyanka – Sevilla – 2015–16
Maksym Koval – Deportivo – 2017–18
Artem Kravets – Granada – 2016–17
Vasyl Kravets – Leganés – 2018–19
Andriy Lunin – Leganés, Real Madrid – 2018–19, 21–
Serhiy Pogodin – Mérida – 1995–96
Vasyl Rats – Espanyol – 1988–89 –  while active.
Viktor Tsyhankov – Girona – 2022–
Roman Zozulya – Betis – 2016–17

Wales 

Gareth Bale – Real Madrid – 2013–20, 21–22
George Green – Espanyol – 1935–36
Mark Hughes – Barcelona – 1986–87

North and Central America, Caribbean (CONCACAF)

Canada 
Julian de Guzman – Deportivo – 2005–09
Cyle Larin – Valladolid – 2022–

Costa Rica 

Celso Borges – Deportivo – 2014–18
Joel Campbell – Betis, Villarreal – 2012–13, 14–15, 17–18
Luis Gabelo Conejo – Albacete – 1991–92, 93–94
Óscar Duarte – Espanyol, Levante – 2015–22
Rónald Gómez – Sporting – 1996–97
Alejandro Morera – Barcelona, Hércules – 1933–36
Keylor Navas – Levante, Real Madrid – 2011–19
José Quesada – Espanyol – 1934–36
Paulo Wanchope – Málaga – 2004–05

Cuba 
Mario Inchausti – Zaragoza – 1939–40
Benito Miró – Espanyol – 1932–33
Juan Muntaner – Barcelona, Deportivo – 1939–40, 41–45

Dominican Republic 
Heinz Barmettler – Valladolid – 2013–14
Tano Bonnín – Osasuna – 2016–17
Mariano Díaz – Real Madrid – 2016–17, 18–
Peter González – Real Madrid – 2021–

El Salvador 
Jorge Alberto "Mágico" González – Cádiz, Valladolid – 1983–85, 86–91
Ricardo Saprissa – Espanyol – 1928–32

Guadeloupe 
Jocelyn Angloma – Valencia – 1997–02
Claudio Beauvue – Celta, Leganés – 2015–18
Dimitri Foulquier – Granada, Getafe, Valencia – 2013–17, 18–19, 19–

Haiti 
Frantz Bertin – Racing – 2004–05
Yves Desmarets – Deportivo – 2010–11

Honduras 
Julio César Arzú – Racing – 1982–83
José Cardona – Elche, Atlético Madrid – 1959–60, 61–69
Allan Costly – Málaga – 1982–83
José Roberto Figueroa – Murcia – 1983–85
Amado Guevara – Valladolid – 1995–96
Anthony Lozano – Girona, Cádiz – 2017–19, 20–
Carlos Pavón – Valladolid – 1995–96
Gilberto Yearwood – Elche, Valladolid – 1977–78, 80–83
Carlos Humberto Zuazo – Elche – 1959–60

Martinique 
Note: Martinique is a French overseas department which is a member of CONCACAF but it is not recognized by FIFA. Players listed here are French citizens who have played for the Martinique national team. They are eligible to play for the France national team. Players with the note "Born in France" were not born in Martinique, despite being a part of France.
Grégory Arnolin – Sporting – 2009–12
Jean-Sylvain Babin – Granada, Sporting – 2014–17
Julien Faubert – Real Madrid – 2008–09
Mickaël Malsa – Levante, Valladolid – 2020–
Florent Poulolo – Getafe – 2019–20
Olivier Thomert – Hércules – 2010–11

Mexico 

Javier Aguirre – Osasuna – 1986–87
Manuel Alonso – Racing – 1934–35
Javier Aquino – Villarreal, Rayo – 2013–15
Néstor Araujo – Celta – 2018–22
Pablo Barrera – Zaragoza – 2011–12
Cuauhtémoc Blanco – Valladolid – 2000–02
José Luis Borbolla – Deportivo, Real Madrid, Celta – 1944–47
Omar Bravo – Deportivo – 2008–09
Nery Castillo – Rayo – 2013–14
Jesús Manuel Corona – Sevilla – 2021–
Francisco Javier Cruz – Logroñés – 1988–89
Luís de la Fuente – Racing – 1934–35
José Manuel de la Torre – Oviedo – 1988–89
Antonio de Nigris – Villarreal – 2002–03
Giovani dos Santos – Barcelona, Racing, Mallorca, Villarreal – 2007–08, 10–11, 12–15
Jonathan dos Santos – Barcelona, Villarreal – 2009–17
Luis Flores – Sporting, Valencia – 1986–87, 88–89
Guillermo Franco – Villarreal – 2005–10
Luis García – Atlético Madrid, Real Sociedad – 1992–95
Andrés Guardado – Deportivo, Valencia, Betis – 2007–11, 12–14, 17–
Javier "Chicharito" Hernández – Real Madrid, Sevilla – 2014–15, 19–20
Héctor Herrera – Atlético Madrid – 2019–22
Javier Iturriaga – Athletic Bilbao – 2006–07 
Raúl Jiménez – Atlético Madrid – 2014–15
Efraín Juárez – Zaragoza – 2011–12
Diego Lainez – Betis – 2018–22
Carlos Laviada – Oviedo – 1934–36
Miguel Layún – Sevilla, Villarreal – 2017–19
José Juan Macías – Getafe – 2021–22
Rafael Márquez – Barcelona – 2003–10
César Montes – Espanyol – 2022–
Héctor Moreno – Espanyol, Real Sociedad – 2011–15, 17–19
Manuel Negrete – Sporting – 1986–87
Carlos Ochoa – Osasuna – 2002–03
Guillermo Ochoa – Málaga, Granada – 2014–17
Francisco Palencia – Espanyol – 2001–02
Orbelín Pineda – Celta – 2021–22
Diego Reyes – Real Sociedad, Espanyol, Leganés – 2015–17, 18–19
Hugo Sánchez – Atlético Madrid, Real Madrid, Rayo – 1981–92, 93–94
José Ramón Sauto – Real Madrid – 1933–36, 39–44
Juan Ángel Seguro – Osasuna – 2003–04
Gerardo Torrado – Sevilla, Racing – 2002–05
Carlos Vela – Osasuna, Real Sociedad – 2007–08, 11–18
Manuel Vidrio – Osasuna – 2002–03
Germán Villa – Espanyol – 1998–99

Panama 

Roberto Chen – Málaga – 2013–14
Julio Dely Valdés – Oviedo, Málaga – 1997–03
Rommel Fernández – Tenerife, Valencia, Albacete – 1989–93
José Luis Rodríguez – Alavés – 2019–20

Puerto Rico 
Eduardo Ordóñez – Atlético Madrid, Real Madrid – 1928–30, 32–33, 34–35

Suriname 
Ryan Donk – Betis – 2016–17
Romano Sion – Compostela – 1997–98

United States of America 

Jozy Altidore – Villarreal – 2008–09, 10–11
Luca de la Torre – Celta – 2022–
Sergiño Dest – Barcelona – 2020–22
Matthew Hoppe – Mallorca – 2021–22
Kasey Keller – Rayo – 1999–01
Luca Koleosho – Espanyol – 2021–
Matt Miazga – Alavés – 2021–22
Shaquell Moore – Levante – 2017–18
Yunus Musah – Valencia – 2020–
Oguchi Onyewu – Málaga – 2012–13

South America (CONMEBOL)

Argentina 

Roberto Abbondanzieri – Getafe – 2006–09
David Ángel Abraham – Getafe – 2012–13
José Acciari – Murcia – 2003–04
Lautaro Acosta – Sevilla, Racing – 2008–12
Marcos Acuña – Sevilla – 2020–
Luis Héctor Adorno – Burgos, Hércules – 1978–80, 81–82
Miguel Ángel Adorno – Valencia – 1971–75, 76–77
Sergio Agüero – Atlético Madrid, Barcelona – 2006–11, 21–22
Marcos Aguirre – Valladolid – 2007–09
Ramón Aguirre Suárez – Granada, Salamanca – 1971–75
Pablo Aimar – Valencia, Zaragoza – 2000–08
Ricardo Albisbeascoechea "Albis" – Málaga, Logroñés, Valladolid – 1982–85, 87–90
Carlos Alfaro Moreno – Espanyol – 1991–92
Fernando Alí – Valladolid – 1981–83
Matías Almeyda – Sevilla – 1996–97
Luis Ramón Alonso – Elche – 1970–71
Carlos Álvarez – Oviedo – 1958–63
Cristian Darío Álvarez – Espanyol, Rayo – 2008–13, 14–15
Cristian Osvaldo Álvarez – Racing – 2003–05, 06–07
Pablo Álvarez – Zaragoza – 2011–12
Gabriel Amato – Hércules, Mallorca, Betis, Albacete – 1996–98, 01–02, 03–04
Marcos Angeleri – Málaga – 2013–16
Fabrizio Angileri – Getafe – 2022–
Cristian Ansaldi – Atlético Madrid – 2014–15
Eduardo Anzarda – Real Madrid, Betis – 1971–73, 74–78, 79–80
Daniel Aquino – Albacete, Betis, Rayo – 1991–92, 94–96
Héctor Aramendi – Valladolid – 1959–61, 62–64
Sergio Araujo – Las Palmas – 2015–17, 17–18
Domingo Arcángel – Deportivo – 1964–65
Mariano Armentano – Osasuna – 2000–02
Emiliano Armenteros – Sevilla, Xerez, Rayo, Osasuna – 2008–10, 11–14
Rodolfo Arruabarrena – Villarreal – 2000–07
Claudio Arzeno – Racing – 1998–01, 02–03
Daniel Astegiano – Rayo – 1977–79
Martín Astudillo – Alavés, Osasuna – 1999–03, 05–06, 07–08
Ezequiel Ávila – Huesca, Osasuna – 2018–
Roberto Ayala – Valencia, Zaragoza – 2000–08, 09–10
Rubén Ayala – Atlético Madrid – 1973–80
Federico Azcárate – Murcia – 2003–04
Éver Banega – Valencia, Atlético Madrid, Sevilla – 2007–14, 14–16, 17–20
Juan Barbas – Zaragoza – 1982–85
Mariano Barbosa – Villarreal, Sevilla – 2005–07, 14–16, 17–18
Rolando Barrera – Mallorca – 1983–84
Gustavo Barros Schelotto – Villarreal – 2000–01
Gustavo Bartelt – Rayo – 2000–01
Federico Basavilbaso – Tenerife – 1998–99, 01–02
Christian Bassedas – Tenerife – 2001–02
Adrián Bastía – Espanyol – 2003–04
José Basualdo – Extremadura – 1996–97
Rodrigo Battaglia – Alavés, Mallorca – 2020–
Sebastián Battaglia – Villarreal – 2003–05
Francisco Bayo – Celta – 1958–59
Juan Benavídez – Espanyol, Granada – 1955–60
Darío Benedetto – Elche – 2021–22
Eduardo Berizzo – Celta, Cádiz – 2000–04, 05–06
Hernán Bernardello – Almería – 2009–12
Sergio Berti – Zaragoza – 1995–96
Daniel Bertoni – Sevilla – 1978–80
Leonardo Biagini – Atlético Madrid, Mérida, Mallorca – 1995–03
Albano Bizarri – Real Madrid, Valladolid, Gimnàstic – 1998–04, 06–07
Lautaro Blanco – Elche – 2022–
Roberto Bonano – Barcelona, Murcia, Alavés – 2001–04, 05–06
Fabián Bonhoff – Castellón – 1989–90
Juan José Borrelli – Oviedo – 1996–97
Lucas Boyé – Celta, Elche – 2017–18, 20–
Pablo Brandán – Alavés – 2000–01
Miguel Brindisi – Las Palmas – 1976–79
Carlos Brizzola – Sevilla, Salamanca – 1976–77, 79–81, 82–83
José Luis Brown – Murcia – 1987–89
Juan Ignacio Brunet – Granada – 2020–21
Emiliano "Emi" Buendía – Getafe – 2014–16
José María Buljubasich – Tenerife, Oviedo – 1994–96, 97–98
Diego Buonanotte – Málaga, Granada – 2011–14
Esteban Burgos – Eibar – 2019–21
Germán Burgos – Mallorca, Atlético Madrid – 1999–01, 02–04
Wilfredo Daniel "Willy" Caballero – Málaga – 2010–14
Gustavo Cabral – Levante, Celta – 2011–19
Luis Cabrera – Atlético Madrid, Cádiz, Castellón – 1980–88, 89–90
Fernando Cáceres – Zaragoza, Valencia, Celta – 1993–04
Juan Pablo Caffa – Betis – 2006–08
Florencio Caffaratti – Barcelona – 1947–49
Diego Cagna – Villarreal – 2000–02
Pablo Calandria – Málaga – 2001–02
Gabriel Calderón – Betis – 1983–87
Jonathan Calleri – Las Palmas, Alavés, Espanyol, Osasuna – 2017–21
José María Calvo – Gimnàstic, Recreativo – 2006–08
Esteban Cambiasso – Real Madrid – 2002–04
Juan Camer – Espanyol, Málaga – 1948–51
Gustavo Campagnuolo – Valencia – 1997–98
Ernesto Candía – Atlético Madrid – 1948–50
Juan Cantarutti – Málaga – 1979–80
Martín Cardetti – Salamanca, Valladolid – 1998–99, 03–04
Daniel Carnevali – Las Palmas – 1973–79
Ramón Carranza – Granada, Espanyol – 1958–62, 63–64
Guido Carrillo – Leganés, Elche – 2018–22
Juan Pablo Carrizo – Zaragoza – 2009–10
Federico Cartabia – Valencia, Córdoba, Deportivo – 2013–17, 17–18
Carlos Casartelli – Salamanca, Espanyol – 1998–00
Gastón Casas – Betis – 2001–03
Santiago Cáseres – Villarreal – 2018–19
Gonzalo Castellani – Villarreal – 2011–12
Valentín Castellanos – Girona – 2022–
Ezequiel Castillo – Espanyol, Tenerife, Rayo – 1988–89, 90–97
Raúl Castronovo – Málaga, Hércules, Salamanca – 1974–75, 76–79
Pablo Cavallero – Espanyol, Celta, Levante – 1999–04, 06–07
José Luis Ceballos – Las Palmas – 1980–81
Emanuel Cecchini – Málaga – 2017–18
Franco Cervi – Celta – 2021–
José Chamot – Atlético Madrid – 1998–00
Nereo Champagne – Leganés – 2016–18
Alfonso Troisi "Charles" – Hércules, Almería – 1976–81
Pablo Chavarría – Mallorca – 2019–20
Pedro Chazarreta – Burgos, Murcia – 1977–79, 80–81
Leandro Chichizola – Las Palmas, Getafe – 2017–19
José Juan Cioffi – Burgos – 1977–78
Rubén Ciraolo – Valencia – 1987–89
Óscar Coll – Espanyol – 1956–61
Fabricio Coloccini – Alavés, Atlético Madrid, Villarreal, Deportivo – 2001–04, 04–08
Diego Colotto – Deportivo, Espanyol – 2008–11, 12–15
Cristián Colusso – Sevilla – 1996–97
Eduardo Commisso – Hércules – 1975–78
Julio Corcuera – Deportivo, Jaén – 1950–55, 56–57
Ángel Correa – Atlético Madrid – 2015–
Joaquín Correa – Sevilla – 2016–18
Oswaldo Cortés – Elche – 1974–78
Bernardo Cos – Barcelona, Burgos – 1972–75, 76–78
Alberto "Tino" Costa – Valencia – 2010–13
Franco Costanzo – Alavés – 2005–06
Eduardo Coudet – Celta – 2002–03
Juan Crespín – Zaragoza, Cádiz – 1988–89, 92–93
Diego Crosa – Betis – 1999–00, 01–02
Braian Cufré – Mallorca – 2022–23
Emmanuel Culio – Las Palmas – 2015–16
Andrés D'Alessandro – Zaragoza – 2006–08
Roberto D'Alessandro – Salamanca – 1974–81, 82–84
Jesús Dátolo – Espanyol – 2010–12
Pablo de Blasis – Eibar – 2018–20
Martín Demichelis – Málaga, Espanyol – 2010–13, 16–17
Rodrigo De Paul – Valencia, Atlético Madrid – 2014–16, 21–
Óscar Dertycia – Cádiz, Tenerife, Albacete – 1990–95
Hermes Desio – Celta, Alavés – 1994–96, 98–03
Daniel "Cata" Díaz – Getafe, Atlético Madrid – 2007–13
Christian Díaz – Mallorca, Albacete – 2001–02, 03–04
Pablo Diaz – Sporting, Zaragoza – 1990–99
José Diéguez – Sevilla – 1957–67
Ángel Di María – Real Madrid – 2010–14
Vicente Di Paola – Lleida – 1950–51
Marcos Aurelio Di Paulo – Barcelona – 1948–51
Franco Di Santo – Rayo – 2018–19
Alfredo Di Stéfano – Real Madrid, Espanyol – 1953–66
Matías Dituro – Celta – 2021–22
Alejandro "Chori" Domínguez – Valencia, Rayo – 2009–11, 12–13
Federico Domínguez – Espanyol – 1998–99
Rogelio Domínguez – Real Madrid – 1957–62
Jorge Dominichi – Elche – 1975–77
Víctor Doria – Sporting – 1973–76, 77–83
Mauro dos Santos – Almería, Eibar, Leganés – 2014–18
Jorge Doval – Elche – 1973–74
Sebastián Dubarbier – Almería – 2013–15
Carlos Duré – Extremadura – 1996–97, 98–99
Aldo Duscher – Deportivo, Racing, Sevilla, Espanyol – 2000–11
Carlos Echarri – Las Palmas – 1979–80
Juan Echecopar – Granada, Murcia – 1973–75
Gonzalo Escalante – Eibar, Alavés, Cádiz – 2015–20, 21–22, 22–
Damián Escudero – Valladolid, Villarreal – 2008–10
Juan Eduardo Esnáider – Real Madrid, Zaragoza, Atlético Madrid, Espanyol, Murcia – 1990–91, 92–99, 00–01, 03–04
Marcelo Espina – Racing – 1999–01
Cristian Espinoza – Alavés – 2016–17
Maximiliano Estévez – Racing – 2000–01
Daniel Fagiani – Valencia – 1999–00
José Fantaguzzi – Betis – 1987–88
Luis Fariña – Deportivo, Rayo – 2014–16
Federico Fazio – Sevilla – 2007–14, 15–16
Darío Felman – Valencia – 1977–83
Carlos Fenoy – Celta, Valladolid – 1976–77, 78–79, 80–88
Augusto Fernández – Celta, Atlético Madrid, Cádiz – 2012–18, 20–21
Favio Fernández – Espanyol – 1996–97
Federico Fernández – Getafe – 2012–13
Nicolás Fernández – Elche – 2022–
Rubén Fernández – Celta – 1982–83
Teodoro Fernández – Las Palmas – 1972–78
Tubo Fernández – Cádiz – 1992–93
Carlos Ferrer – Espanyol – 1939–40
Enzo Ferrero – Sporting – 1975–76, 77–85
Óscar Ferrero – Sporting, Castellón – 1978–79, 80–82
Facundo Ferreyra – Espanyol – 2018–20
Luciano Figueroa – Villarreal – 2004–06
Ubaldo Fillol – Atlético Madrid – 1985–86
Mario Finarolli – Elche – 1976–78
Daniel Flores – Rayo – 1978–79
José Óscar "Turu" Flores – Deportivo, Valladolid, Mallorca – 1998–03
Juan Forlín – Espanyol – 2009–13
Juan Carlos Forneris – Granada, Elche – 1959–61, 62–66
Élio Fortunato – Las Palmas – 1981–83
Juan Foyth – Villarreal – 2020–
Rafael Franco – Deportivo, Valladolid – 1948–52
Darío Franco – Zaragoza – 1991–95
Leo Franco – Mallorca, Atlético Madrid, Zaragoza – 1999–13
Matías Fritzler – Hércules – 2010–11
Fabricio Fuentes – Villarreal – 2006–09
Esteban Fuertes – Tenerife – 2001–02
Ramiro Funes Mori – Villarreal – 2018–21
Iván Gabrich – Mérida, Extremadura, Mallorca – 1997–00
Jorge Gabrich – Barcelona – 1983–84
Fernando Gago – Real Madrid, Valencia – 2006–11, 12–13
Nicolás Gaitán – Atlético Madrid – 2016–18
Walter Gaitán – Villarreal – 1998–99, 00–01
Luciano Galletti – Zaragoza, Atlético Madrid – 2001–02, 03–07
Fernando Gamboa – Oviedo – 1996–98
Leonel Gancedo – Osasuna, Murcia – 2000–04
Antonio Garabal – Atlético Madrid – 1956–58
Ezequiel Garay – Racing, Real Madrid, Valencia – 2005–11, 16–20
Antonio García – Salamanca – 1975–78
Horacio García – Jaén – 1957–58
Mateo García – Las Palmas – 2016–17
Oswaldo García – Deportivo, Espanyol, Granada – 1950–58
Óscar Garro – Celta, Sporting – 1948–49, 51–52
Roberto Gasparini – Málaga – 1982–83
Paulo Gazzaniga – Elche – 2020–21
Humberto Giménez – Barcelona – 1949–50
Sebastián Giménez – Hércules – 1975–76
Leandro Gioda – Xerez – 2009–10
Carmelo Giuliano – Hércules – 1974–81
Blas Giunta – Murcia – 1988–89
Juan Gómez – Real Sociedad – 1996–00
Papu Gómez – Sevilla – 2020–
Raúl Gómez – Celta – 1958–59
Pedro Gómez Vila – Zaragoza – 1972–73
Juan Antonio Gómez Voglino – Elche – 1974–78
Esteban González – Málaga – 1989–90
Cristian "Kily" González – Zaragoza, Valencia – 1996–03
Ignacio "Nacho" González – Las Palmas – 2000–02
Óscar González – Rayo, Atlético Madrid – 1977–80
Silvio González – Numancia – 2004–05
Patricio Graff – Rayo, Numancia – 2001–03, 04–05
Jorge Griffa – Atlético Madrid, Espanyol – 1959–69, 70–71
Carlos Guerini – Málaga, Real Madrid – 1973–79
Ernesto Gutiérrez – Celta – 1956–58
Jonás Gutiérrez – Mallorca, Deportivo – 2005–08, 15–16
Marcelo Gutiérrez – Racing – 1982–83
Gabriel Heinze – Valladolid, Real Madrid – 1999–01, 07–09
Ramón Heredia – Atlético Madrid – 1973–77
Germán Herrera – Real Sociedad – 2006–07
Martín Herrera – Alavés – 1999–02
Horacio Herrero – Valencia, Racing – 1948–49, 50–52
Gonzalo Higuaín – Real Madrid – 2006–13
Mario Husillos – Murcia, Cádiz – 1983–85, 89–91
Ariel Ibagaza – Mallorca, Atlético Madrid, Villarreal – 1998–10
Hugo Ibarra – Espanyol – 2004–05
José Iglesias – Valencia – 1983–84
Antonio Imbelloni – Real Madrid – 1950–51
Emanuel Insúa – Granada – 2014–15
Emiliano Insúa – Atlético Madrid, Rayo – 2012–15
Federico Insúa – Málaga – 2003–04
Rubén Insúa – Las Palmas – 1985–86
Horacio Insurralde – Elche – 1977–78
Luis Islas – Logroñés – 1989–90
Franco Jara – Granada – 2011–12
Mario Kempes – Valencia, Hércules – 1976–81, 82–86
Mario Killer – Sporting – 1975–76, 77–78
Diego Klimowicz – Rayo, Valladolid – 1996–97, 97–99
Matías Kranevitter – Atlético Madrid, Sevilla – 2015–17
Erik Lamela – Sevilla – 2021–
Ángel Landucci – Sporting – 1973–76
Jorge Larraz – Las Palmas, Granada, Tenerife, Deportivo – 1957–61, 61–62, 62–63
Joaquín Larrivey – Rayo, Celta – 2013–15
Diego Latorre – Tenerife, Salamanca – 1992–96
Juan Laureano "Lauren" – Murcia – 1950–51
Jeremías Ledesma – Cádiz – 2020–
Ramón León – Oviedo – 1961–62
Matías Lequi – Atlético Madrid, Celta – 2003–04, 05–07
Lucas Licht – Getafe – 2006–10
Óscar Limia – Cádiz – 2005–06
Olegario Lisboa – Espanyol – 1963–64
Lucas Lobos – Cádiz – 2005–06
Giovani Lo Celso – Betis, Villarreal – 2018–19, 21–
Gabriel Loeschbor – Murcia – 2003–04
Ricardo Logiácono – Málaga – 1979–80
Gustavo Lombardi – Salamanca, Alavés – 1997–98, 01–02
Raúl Longhi – Espanyol – 1976–81
Ariel "Chupa" López – Mallorca – 1998–99
Claudio López – Valencia – 1996–00
Gustavo López – Zaragoza, Celta – 1995–04, 05–07
Joaquín López – Salamanca – 1977–79
Jorge López Nieva – Burgos, Sevilla – 1978–85
Maximiliano "Maxi" López – Barcelona, Mallorca – 2004–07
Víctor López – Real Sociedad – 2006–07
Juan Carlos Lorenzo – Atlético Madrid – 1954–56
Walter Lozano – Valladolid – 1989–90, 93–94
Dante Lugo – Atlético Madrid – 1956–58
Ezequiel Luna – Tenerife – 2009–10
Ricardo Lunari – Salamanca – 1998–99
Cristian Lupidio – Salamanca – 1998–99
Federico Lussenhoff – Tenerife, Mallorca – 1998–99, 01–04
Germán Lux – Mallorca, Deportivo – 2007–11, 12–13, 14–17
Francisco Maciel – Murcia, Mallorca – 2003–04, 05–06
Edgardo Madinabeytia – Atlético Madrid – 1958–67
Lisandro Magallán – Alavés, Elche – 2019–20, 22–
Cristian Maidana – Recreativo – 2008–09
Juan Carlos Mameli – Betis – 1974–75
Martín Mandra – Rayo – 1999–00
Martín Mantovani – Leganés, Huesca – 2016–18, 18–19
Diego Maradona – Barcelona, Sevilla – 1982–84, 92–93
Hugo Maradona – Rayo – 1989–90
Agustín Marchesín – Celta – 2022–
Iván Marcone – Elche – 2020–22
Claudio Marini – Numancia – 2000–01
Bruno Marioni – Villarreal, Tenerife – 2000–02
Armando Martín – Zaragoza – 1967–71
Emiliano Martínez – Getafe – 2017–18
Jesús Martínez – Valencia – 1968–69, 70–78
Jorge Martínez – Zaragoza – 1999–00
Ricardo Martínez – Almería – 1979–81
Román Martínez – Espanyol, Tenerife – 2008–10
Miguel Martino – Oviedo – 1949–50
Gerardo Martino – Tenerife – 1990–91
Alejandro Martinuccio – Villarreal – 2011–12
Óscar Mas – Real Madrid – 1973–74
Javier Mascherano – Barcelona – 2010–18
Eduardo Massey – Oviedo – 1958–59
Aníbal Matellán – Getafe, Gimnàstic – 2005–07
Diego Mateo – Racing – 2002–05
Marcos Mauro – Cádiz – 2020–22
Javier Mazzoni – Racing – 2000–01
Carlos Medrano – Barcelona – 1959–60
Óscar Mena – Mallorca, Atlético Madrid – 1997–00
Sebastián Méndez – Celta – 2001–04, 05–06
Gabriel Mercado – Sevilla – 2016–19
Lionel Messi – Barcelona – 2004–21
Diego Milito – Zaragoza – 2005–08
Gabriel Milito – Zaragoza, Barcelona – 2003–11
Hugo Módigo – Sevilla – 1977–78
Nahuel Molina – Atlético Madrid – 2022–
Daniel Montenegro – Zaragoza, Osasuna – 2000–02
Gonzalo Montiel – Sevilla – 2021–
Walter Montoya – Sevilla – 2016–18
Luciano Fabián Monzón – Betis – 2008–09
Hugo Morales – Tenerife – 2001–02
Ángel "Matute" Morales – Mérida – 1997–98
Pedro Morant – Hércules – 1996–97
Carlos Morete – Las Palmas, Sevilla – 1975–81
Guillermo Morigi – Valencia – 1997–98
Horacio Moyano – Hércules, Betis, Murcia, Celta – 1977–82, 83–88
Ezequiel Muñoz – Leganés – 2017–19
Javier Muñoz – Tenerife, Valladolid – 2001–03
Daniel Murúa – Sevilla – 1979–82
Mateo Musacchio – Villarreal – 2009–12, 13–17
Damián Musto – Huesca – 2018–19
Ariel Nahuelpán – Racing – 2010–12
José Navarro – Real Madrid – 1947–49
Mauro Navas – Espanyol – 1999–03
Sebastián Nayar – Recreativo – 2008–09
Juan Neira – Valladolid – 2012–13
Mateu Nicolau – Barcelona – 1948–52
Félix Nieto – Málaga – 1979–80
Lucas Ocampos – Sevilla – 2019–22, 22–
Marcelo Ojeda – Tenerife – 1994–98
Pedro Ojeda – Numancia – 1999–01
Roque Olsen – Real Madrid – 1950–57
Lucas Orbán – Valencia, Levante – 2014–16
Catriel Orcellet – Valladolid – 2003–04
Roberto Orellana – Elche, Mallorca – 1976–78, 83–84
Rodolfo Orife – Betis – 1971–73
Ariel Ortega – Valencia – 1996–98
Luis Oruezábal – Granada – 1973–76
Aldo Osorio – Numancia – 2004–05
Nicolás Otamendi – Valencia – 2014–15
Iselin Ovejero – Atlético Madrid, Zaragoza – 1969–76
Eduardo Oviedo – Valladolid – 1982–84
Basilio Padrón – Valencia, Las Palmas – 1955–59
Martín Palermo – Villarreal, Betis – 2000–04
Francisco Marqués "Pancho" – Real Sociedad – 1951–52
Nicolás Pareja – Espanyol, Sevilla – 2008–10, 13–18
Pedro Pascual Ros – Barcelona – 1939–40
Javier Pastore – Elche – 2021–23
Severiano Pavón – Espanyol, Almería – 1978–80
Mariano Pavone – Betis – 2007–09
Matías Pavoni – Cádiz – 2005–06
Pablo Paz – Tenerife, Valladolid – 1996–99, 01–02, 03–04
Emilio Pazos – Sevilla, Granada, Murcia – 1967–68, 69–72, 73–75
Mauricio Pellegrino – Barcelona, Valencia, Alavés – 1998–05, 05–06
José Pellejero – Granada, Racing, Elche – 1957–63
Hernán Pellerano – Almería – 2008–11, 13–14
Eleuterio Peña – Real Sociedad, Atlético Madrid – 1931–33, 34–36
Gabriel Peñalba – Las Palmas – 2017–18
Adrián Peralta – Mallorca – 2005–06
Guillermo Pereyra – Mallorca – 2003–08
Enzo Pérez – Valencia – 2014–17
Hugo Pérez – Sporting – 1994–97
Miguel Pérez – Real Madrid, Zaragoza – 1967–71, 72–73
Nehuén Pérez – Granada – 2020–21
Pablo Pérez – Málaga – 2013–14
Ricardo Pérez – Granada – 1957–58
Diego Perotti – Sevilla – 2008–14
Germán Pezzella – Betis – 2015–17, 21–
Pablo Piatti – Almería, Valencia, Espanyol, Elche – 2008–20, 20–22
Agustín Pastoriza "Pibe" – Betis – 2013–14
Iván Pillud – Espanyol – 2009–10
Héctor Pineda – Mallorca – 1998–99
Javier Pinola – Atlético Madrid – 2003–04
Leonardo Pisculichi – Mallorca – 2005–07
Guido Pizarro – Sevilla – 2017–18
Diego Placente – Celta – 2005–07
Mauricio Pochettino – Espanyol – 1994–01, 03–06
Roberto Pompei – Oviedo – 1997–00
Ezequiel Ponce – Granada, Elche – 2016–17, 21–
Rafael Ponce – Deportivo – 1948–51
Leonardo Ponzio – Zaragoza – 2003–07, 09–12
Martín Posse – Espanyol – 1998–03, 04–06
Carlos Próugenes – Mallorca – 1969–70
Nery Pumpido – Betis – 1988–89
Daniel Quevedo – Málaga – 1976–77
Diego Quintana – Murcia – 2003–04
Jorge Quinteros – Mallorca – 1999–00
Sebastián Rambert – Zaragoza – 1995–96
Fernando Redondo – Tenerife, Real Madrid – 1990–00
Óscar Regenhardt – Málaga – 1982–85
Gustavo Reggi – Levante – 2004–05, 06–07
Ezequiel Rescaldani – Málaga – 2013–15
Ricardo Rezza – Salamanca, Sporting – 1974–80
Pablo Richetti – Valladolid – 2000–04
Emiliano Rigoni – Elche – 2020–21
Jorge Rinaldi – Sporting – 1985–86
Juan Román Riquelme – Barcelona, Villarreal – 2002–07
Gerardo Rivero – Osasuna – 2001–04
Carlos Roa – Mallorca, Albacete – 1997–99, 00–02, 03–04
Lucas Robertone – Almería – 2022–
Manuel Rocha – Real Madrid – 1947–48
Roberto Roche – Elche – 1959–60
Adalberto Rodríguez – Jaén, Atlético Madrid – 1957–59
Clemente Rodríguez – Espanyol – 2007–08
Fernando Rodríguez – Málaga, Elche – 1982–84, 88–89
Gonzalo Rodríguez – Villarreal – 2004–12
Guido Rodríguez – Betis – 2019–
Maxi Rodríguez – Espanyol, Atlético Madrid – 2002–10
Osvaldo Rodríguez – Racing – 1981–82
José Luis "Puma" Rodríguez – Betis – 1988–89, 90–91
Alfredo Rojas – Celta, Betis – 1958–61
Esteban Rolón – Málaga – 2017–18
Bernardo Romeo – Mallorca, Osasuna – 2004–07
Luka Romero – Mallorca – 2019–20
Sebastián Ariel Romero – Betis – 1999–00
Facundo Roncaglia – Espanyol, Celta, Valencia, Osasuna – 2009–10, 16–21
Pablo Rotchen – Espanyol – 1999–02
Marco Rubén – Recreativo, Villarreal – 2007–12
Luis Rueda – Extremadura – 1998–99
Oscar Ruggeri – Logroñés, Real Madrid – 1988–90
Gerónimo Rulli – Real Sociedad, Villarreal – 2014–19, 20–23
Franco Russo – Mallorca – 2021–23
Gerónimo Saccardi – Hércules – 1975–79
Fernando Salgado – Las Palmas – 1958–59
Eduardo Salvio – Atlético Madrid – 2009–10, 11–12
Walter Samuel – Real Madrid – 2004–05
Dante Sanabria – Hércules, Sevilla – 1984–87
José María Sánchez Lage – Oviedo, Valencia, Deportivo – 1958–67
Juan Sánchez Miño – Elche – 2020–21
Manuel Sánchez – Oviedo – 1958–59
Pablo "Vitamina" Sánchez – Alavés – 1998–99
José Sand – Deportivo – 2010–11
Evaristo Sande – Oviedo, Málaga, Granada – 1958–60, 62–63, 66–67
Gastón Sangoy – Sporting – 2010–12
Miguel Santoro – Hércules – 1974–77
Benjamín Santos – Deportivo – 1956–57
Guillermo Sara – Betis – 2013–14
Pedro Sará – Oviedo, Murcia, Jaén – 1949–50, 52–54, 55–56, 57–58
Juan Sarrachini – Mallorca – 1969–70
Javier Saviola – Barcelona, Sevilla, Real Madrid, Málaga – 2001–04, 05–09, 12–13
Lionel Scaloni – Deportivo, Racing, Mallorca – 1997–06, 06–07, 07–09
Gabriel Schürrer – Racing, Deportivo, Las Palmas, Real Sociedad – 1996–04
Héctor Scotta – Sevilla – 1976–80
Darío Scotto – Sporting – 1992–93
Juan Serrizuela – Mallorca – 1999–00
Jonathan Silva – Leganés, Getafe – 2018–20, 21–22
Walter Silvani – Extremadura, Salamanca – 1996–99
Diego Simeone – Sevilla, Atlético Madrid – 1992–97, 03–05
Giuliano Simeone – Atlético Madrid – 2021–
Gustavo Siviero – Mallorca, Albacete – 1998–02, 03–05
Augusto Solari – Celta – 2020–
Esteban Solari – Almería – 2008–10
Santiago Solari – Atlético Madrid, Real Madrid – 1998–05
Juan Solé – Valladolid, Oviedo, Murcia – 1959–61, 62–64
Leandro Somoza – Villarreal, Betis – 2006–08
Juan Pablo Sorín – Barcelona, Villarreal – 2002–03, 04–06
José Sosa – Atlético Madrid – 2013–14
Juan Sotelo – Murcia – 1980–81
Ernesto Suárez – Espanyol – 1973–74
Leonardo Suárez – Villarreal, Valladolid – 2016–19
Alexander Szymanowski – Leganés – 2016–19
Juan Taverna – Murcia – 1973–74
Nahuel Tenaglia – Alavés – 2021–22
Fernando Tissone – Mallorca, Málaga – 2011–12, 12–16
Mariano Toedtli – Sevilla – 2001–03
Hernán Toledo – Las Palmas – 2017–18
Marco Torsiglieri – Almería – 2013–14
Óscar Trejo – Mallorca, Sporting, Rayo – 2006–09, 11–12, 18–19, 21–
Marcelo Trobbiani – Elche, Zaragoza – 1976–78, 80–81
Roberto Trotta – Sporting – 1997–98
Mario Turdó – Celta, Las Palmas – 1999–01
Eduardo Tuzzio – Mallorca – 2005–06
Leonardo Ulloa – Almería – 2010–11
Juan Urruti – Valencia – 1983–86
Óscar Ustari – Getafe – 2007–11
Hugo Vaca – Cádiz – 1981–82
Jorge Valdano – Zaragoza, Real Madrid – 1979–87
José Valdiviezo – Atlético Madrid – 1947–49
Diego Valeri – Almería – 2010–11
José Valle – Lleida – 1950–51
Matías Vargas – Espanyol – 2019–20
Fabián Vázquez – Cádiz – 1990–92
Franco Vázquez – Rayo, Sevilla – 2012–13, 16–21
Luciano Vella – Cádiz – 2005–06
Pedro Verde – Las Palmas, Hércules – 1973–74, 75–79
Santiago Vergini – Getafe – 2015–16
Juan Carlos Verón – Racing, Mallorca – 1981–84
Sebastián Viberti – Málaga – 1970–74
Luciano Vietto – Villarreal, Atlético Madrid, Sevilla, Valencia – 2014–18
José Vigo – Celta – 1957–58
Rodolfo Vilanova – Málaga – 1970–75, 76–77
Guillermo Villagrá – Arenas, Valencia – 1931–36
José Villarreal – Atlético Madrid – 1992–93
Francisco Villegas – Sevilla – 1942–43
Martín Vitali – Getafe – 2004–05
Nelson Vivas – Celta – 1999–00
Antonio Vucetich – Espanyol – 1948–49
Axel Werner – Atlético Madrid, Huesca – 2017–19
Enrique Wolff – Las Palmas, Real Madrid – 1974–79
Pablo Zabaleta – Espanyol – 2005–08
Julio Zamora – Sabadell – 1987–88
Víctor Zapata – Valladolid – 2003–04
Ariel Zárate – Málaga – 1999–02
Rolando Zárate – Real Madrid – 1999–00
Bruno Zuculini – Valencia, Córdoba – 2014–15
Franco Zuculini – Zaragoza – 2011–13
Rafael Zuviría – Racing, Barcelona, Mallorca – 1973–74, 75–82, 83–84

Bolivia 
Marco Etcheverry – Albacete – 1991–92
Juan Manuel Peña – Valladolid, Villarreal – 1995–07
Marco Sandy – Valladolid – 1995–96

Brazil 

Abner Vinícius – Betis – 2022–
Ademir – Celta – 1978–79, 82–83
Aderlan Santos – Valencia – 2015–17
Adriano – Sevilla, Barcelona – 2004–16
Adriano – Málaga – 2008–09
Adriano Teixeira – Celta – 1996–97, 98–00
Alcántara – Sporting – 1975–76
Alemão – Atlético Madrid – 1986–88
Alexandre Pato – Villarreal – 2016–17
Alex Telles – Sevilla – 2022–
Almir – Levante – 1963–64
Aloísio Pires – Barcelona – 1988–90
Álvaro José Rodríguez – Atlético Madrid – 1959–60
Álvaro Luiz Maior – Las Palmas, Zaragoza, Levante – 2000–02, 03–08
Amarildo – Celta, Logroñés – 1988–89, 92–93
Amoroso – Málaga – 2004–05
Anderson Silva – Racing, Málaga – 2003–06
André Luiz – Tenerife – 1997–99
Andreas Pereira – Granada, Valencia – 2016–18
Andrei Frascarelli – Atlético Madrid – 1997–98
Antônio Carlos – Albacete – 1992–93
Argel – Racing – 2004–05
Arílson – Valladolid – 1999–00
Arthur – Barcelona – 2018–20
Arthuro – Alavés – 2005–06
Baiano – Las Palmas – 2000–01
Baltazar – Celta, Atlético Madrid – 1985–86, 87–91
Bebeto – Deportivo, Sevilla – 1992–97
Bio – Barcelona, Espanyol – 1977–80
Braga – Celta, Espanyol, Oviedo – 1957–61
Brasi – Murcia – 1986–87
Cacá – Albacete – 2003–04
Cafu – Zaragoza – 1994–95
Canário – Real Madrid, Sevilla, Zaragoza – 1959–68
Carleto – Valencia – 2008–09
Casemiro – Real Madrid – 2012–14, 15–23
César Coelho – Sevilla – 1981–83
César Sampaio – Deportivo – 2000–01
Charles – Celta, Málaga, Eibar – 2013–20
Charles Fabian – Málaga – 1989–90
Chicão – Valencia – 1962–64
Cicinho – Real Madrid – 2005–07
Cicinho – Sevilla – 2012–13
Cléber Américo da Conceição – Logroñés – 1991–94
Cléber Eduardo Arado – Mérida – 1997–98
Cléber Santana – Atlético Madrid, Mallorca – 2007–10
Cuca – Valladolid – 1990–91
Dani Alves – Sevilla, Barcelona – 2002–16, 21–22
Danilo – Real Madrid – 2015–17
Danilo Barbosa – Valencia – 2015–16
Denílson – Betis – 1998–00, 01–05
Deyverson – Levante, Alavés, Getafe – 2015–17, 19–21
Didi – Real Madrid – 1959–60
Diego – Atlético Madrid – 2011–12, 13–14
Diego Alves – Almería, Valencia – 2007–17
Diego Carlos – Sevilla – 2019–22
Diego Costa – Valladolid, Atlético Madrid, Rayo – 2009–14, 17–21
Diego Tardelli – Betis – 2005–06
Dinho – Deportivo – 1991–92
Dirceu – Atlético Madrid – 1979–82
Djalminha – Deportivo – 1997–02, 03–04
Dória – Granada – 2015–16
Doriva – Celta – 2000–03
Douglas – Barcelona, Sporting – 2014–17
Douglas Luiz – Girona – 2017–19
Duca – Zaragoza, Mallorca – 1958–66
Duda – Sevilla – 1975–76
Éder Militão – Real Madrid – 2019–
Edimar – Córdoba – 2014–15
Edmílson – Barcelona, Villarreal, Zaragoza – 2004–09, 09–11
Edu – Celta, Betis – 2000–09
Edu – Valencia – 2005–09
Edu Manga – Valladolid – 1996–98
Eduardo – Espanyol – 2005–07
Elias – Atlético Madrid – 2010–11
Élton – Alavés – 2005–06
Emerson – Tenerife, Deportivo, Atlético Madrid – 1997–99, 00–03
Emerson – Real Madrid – 2006–07
Emerson Royal – Betis, Barcelona – 2018–22
Esquerdinha – Zaragoza – 2001–02
Evaristo – Barcelona, Real Madrid – 1957–64
Ewerthon – Zaragoza, Espanyol – 2005–07, 07–08, 09–10
Fabiano Eller – Atlético Madrid – 2006–08
Fabiano Pereira – Albacete – 2003–04
Fabiano Soares – Celta, Compostela – 1989–90, 94–98
Fábio Aurélio – Valencia – 2000–06
Fábio Pinto – Oviedo – 1998–00
Fábio Rochemback – Barcelona – 2001–03
Felipe – Atlético Madrid – 2019–23
Felipe Mattioni – Mallorca, Espanyol – 2009–15
Felipe Melo – Mallorca, Racing, Almería – 2004–08
Fernando – Sevilla – 2019–
Fernando Abreu – Racing – 2006–07
Fernando Baiano – Málaga, Celta, Murcia – 2004–08
Fernando Guidicelli – Real Madrid – 1935–36
Filipe Augusto – Valencia – 2014–15
Filipe Luís – Deportivo, Atlético Madrid – 2006–14, 15–19
Flávio Conceição – Deportivo, Real Madrid – 1996–03
Fredson Camara – Espanyol – 2002–07
Gabriel Paulista – Villarreal, Valencia – 2013–15, 17–
Gabriel Pires – Leganés – 2016–18
Gabriel Rodrigues – Málaga – 2005–06
Gabriel Silva – Granada – 2016–17
Ganso – Sevilla – 2016–18
Genilson – Málaga – 1999–00
George Lucas – Celta – 2006–07
Geovanni Deiberson – Barcelona – 2001–03
Gilberto Alves "Gil" – Murcia – 1980–81
Gilberto Ribeiro "Gil" – Gimnàstic – 2006–07
Gilmar – Zaragoza, Rayo – 1996–00
Gilson – Logroñés – 1990–91
Giovanella – Salamanca, Celta – 1997–04, 05–06
Giovanni Silva – Barcelona – 1996–99
Glaucio – Rayo – 2000–02
Guilherme Arana – Sevilla – 2017–19
Guilherme Cassio Alves – Rayo – 1995–97
Guilherme dos Santos Torres – Deportivo – 2016–18
Guilherme Oliveira Santos – Almería – 2007–10
Guilherme Siqueira – Granada, Atlético Madrid, Valencia – 2011–13, 14–17
Guina – Murcia, Tenerife – 1983–85, 86–87, 89–90
Gustavo Nery – Zaragoza – 2006–07
Henrique Almeida – Granada – 2011–12
Índio – Espanyol – 1959–62
Iriney – Rayo, Celta, Almería, Betis, Granada – 2002–03, 05–09, 11–13
Iván Rocha – Valladolid, Atlético Madrid, Logroñés, Mallorca, Alavés, Numancia – 1993–95, 96–97, 97–00
Jajá – Getafe – 2005–06
Jamelli – Zaragoza – 1997–02
Jeremias – Espanyol – 1975–78
João Jorge – Oviedo – 1962–63
João Victor – Mallorca – 2010–13
Joãozinho – Recreativo – 2002–03
Joel – Valencia – 1958–61
Jonas – Valencia – 2010–14
Jônatas – Espanyol – 2006–08
Jonathas – Elche, Real Sociedad – 2014–16
Jordão – Cádiz – 1991–92
Jorge Wagner – Betis – 2006–07
Josimar – Sevilla – 1987–88
Juca – Deportivo – 2009–11
Juliano Belletti – Villarreal, Barcelona – 2002–07
Júlio Baptista – Sevilla, Real Madrid, Málaga – 2003–06, 07–08, 10–13
Júlio César – Valladolid, Real Madrid, Real Sociedad – 1996–01, 03–04
Júlio César Jacobi – Granada, Getafe – 2011–12, 13–14
Juninho – Atlético Madrid – 1997–99
Kaiky – Almería – 2022–
Kaká – Real Madrid – 2009–13
Kelly – Logroñés – 1996–97
Kenedy – Getafe, Granada, Valladolid – 2019–21, 22–
Lázaro – Almería – 2022–
Leandro Damião – Betis – 2015–16
Leandro Machado – Valencia, Tenerife – 1996–97, 98–99
Leivinha – Atlético Madrid – 1975–79
Léo Baptistão – Rayo, Atlético Madrid, Betis, Villarreal, Espanyol, Almería – 2012–19, 22–
Leonardo – Valencia – 1991–93
Liert – Betis – 1962–64
Lima – Betis – 2007–09
Livinho – Oviedo – 1962–64
Lucas Piazon – Málaga – 2012–13
Lucas Silva – Real Madrid – 2014–15
Luciano – Leganés – 2016–17
Lucídio Batista da Silva – Barcelona – 1947–48
Luís Fabiano – Sevilla – 2005–11
Luisinho da Silva – Las Palmas – 1981–82
Luisinho Quintanilha – Celta – 1993–94
Luiz Alberto – Real Sociedad – 2000–02, 04–05
Luiz Carlos – Murcia – 1987–88
Luiz Henrique – Betis – 2022–
Luizão – Deportivo – 1997–98
Luiz Pereira – Atlético Madrid – 1975–80
Macedo – Cádiz – 1992–93
Machado – Valencia – 1957–60
Matuzalém – Zaragoza – 2007–08
Magno Mocelin – Alavés – 1998–03
Malcom – Barcelona – 2018–19
Marcão – Sevilla – 2022–
Marcelino Carioca – Valencia – 1997–98
Marcelo – Real Madrid – 2006–22
Marcelo Rocha – Rayo – 1992–93
Marcos André – Valladolid, Valencia – 2020–
Marcos Assunção – Betis – 2002–07
Mariano Ferreira – Sevilla – 2015–17
Marinho Peres – Barcelona – 1974–76
Marlon Brandão – Valladolid – 1993–94
Marlon Santos – Barcelona – 2016–17
Martins – Mallorca – 1961–62
Matheus Cunha – Atlético Madrid – 2021–23
Matheus Fernandes – Valladolid – 2019–20
Mauricio Casas – Castellón – 1990–91
Maurício Leandro – Compostela – 1996–97
Maurício Oliveira – Celta – 1989–90
Mauro Silva – Deportivo – 1992–05
Maxwell – Barcelona – 2009–12
Mazinho – Valencia, Celta – 1994–00
Messias – Racing – 2002–03
Michel Macedo – Almería, Las Palmas – 2008–11, 14–15, 16–18
Miranda – Atlético Madrid – 2011–15
Moacir – Atlético Madrid, Sevilla – 1993–94, 94–96
Moreira – Betis – 1958–59
Naldo – Getafe, Espanyol – 2014–15, 17–20
Nenê – Mallorca, Alavés, Celta, Espanyol – 2003–04, 05–07, 08–09
Neto – Valencia, Barcelona – 2017–22
Neymar – Barcelona – 2013–17
Nilmar – Villarreal – 2009–12
Nílson – Celta, Albacete, Valladolid – 1989–90, 93–95
Odair – Almería – 1979–80
Pablo Barros – Málaga – 2008–09
Palhinha – Mallorca – 1997–98
Paulão – Betis – 2011–14
Paulinho – Barcelona – 2017–18
Paulo Assunção – Atlético Madrid, Deportivo – 2008–12, 12–13
Pedro Botelho – Rayo, Levante – 2011–12
Pedro Oldoni – Valladolid – 2008–09
Petros – Betis – 2015–17
Philippe Coutinho – Espanyol, Barcelona – 2011–12, 17–19, 20–22
Pinheiro – Osasuna – 2003–04
Pintinho – Sevilla, Cádiz – 1980–84, 85–86
Rafael Jacques – Betis – 1998–99
Rafael Martins – Levante – 2014–15
Rafael Sóbis – Betis – 2006–08
Rafinha – Celta, Barcelona, Real Sociedad – 2013–17, 18–20, 21–22
Ramalho – Murcia – 1988–89
Ramiro – Atlético Madrid – 1959–65
Raphinha – Barcelona – 2022–
Recamán – Espanyol, Valencia – 1958–63
Reinier Jesus – Girona – 2022–
Renaldo – Deportivo – 1996–97
Renan – Valencia, Xerez – 2008–10
Renan Lodi – Atlético Madrid – 2019–22
Renato – Sevilla – 2004–11
Ricardo Bóvio – Málaga – 2005–06
Ricardo Oliveira – Valencia, Betis, Zaragoza – 2003–06, 07–08, 08–09
Rivaldo – Deportivo, Barcelona – 1996–02
Robert – Betis – 2005–07
Roberto Sousa – Celta – 2005–06
Roberto Dinamite – Barcelona – 1979–80
Roberto Carlos – Real Madrid – 1996–07
Robinho – Real Madrid – 2005–08
Ricardo Rocha – Real Madrid – 1991–93
Rodrigão – Sporting – 1997–98
Rodrigo Ely – Alavés, Almería – 2016–21, 22–
Rodrigo Fabri – Valladolid, Atlético Madrid – 1999–00, 03–04
Rodrygo – Real Madrid – 2019–
Romário – Barcelona, Valencia – 1993–95, 96–97, 97–98
Ronaldinho – Barcelona – 2003–08
Ronaldo – Barcelona, Real Madrid – 1996–97, 02–07
Rosinei – Murcia – 2007–08
Rossato – Real Sociedad, Málaga – 2004–05, 06–07, 08–09
Rovérsio – Osasuna – 2008–10, 11–12
Ryder Matos – Córdoba – 2014–15
Samuel Lino – Valencia – 2022–
Sávio – Real Madrid, Zaragoza, Real Sociedad, Levante – 1997–02, 03–06, 06–08
Sena – Osasuna – 2000–01
Sidnei – Espanyol, Deportivo, Betis – 2013–21
Sinval – Mérida – 1995–96, 97–98
Sonny Anderson – Barcelona, Villarreal – 1997–99, 03–05
Souza – Sporting – 1996–97
Sylvinho – Celta, Barcelona – 2001–09
Tato – Elche – 1988–89
Thiago Galhardo – Celta – 2021–
Tilico – Cádiz, Atlético Madrid – 1991–92, 93–94
Toni – Valencia – 1989–93
Totó – Zaragoza – 1969–70, 72–73
Vágner – Celta – 2000–04
Vavá – Atlético Madrid – 1958–61
Vinícius Araújo – Valencia – 2013–14
Vinícius Júnior – Real Madrid – 2018–
Vinícius Souza – Espanyol – 2022–
Viola – Valencia – 1995–96
Vítor – Real Madrid – 1993–94
Waldo – Valencia – 1961–70
Walter – Valencia – 1957–61
Wanderley – Levante, Málaga – 1963–65, 67–69
Wanderson – Getafe – 2015–16
Weligton – Málaga – 2008–17
Wellington Silva – Levante, Almería – 2010–11, 14–15
Welliton – Celta – 2013–14
Wesley Lopes – Alavés – 2005–06
Willian José – Real Madrid, Las Palmas, Real Sociedad, Betis – 2013–14, 15–21, 21–
Yan Couto – Girona – 2022–
Zé Maria – Levante – 2006–07
Zé Roberto – Real Madrid – 1996–98

Chile 

Tomás Alarcón – Cádiz – 2021–23
Jorge Aravena – Valladolid – 1985–86
Christian Bravo – Granada – 2013–14
Claudio Bravo – Real Sociedad, Barcelona, Betis – 2006–07, 10–16, 20–
Fernando Carvallo – Cádiz – 1977–78
Carlos Caszely – Espanyol – 1975–78
Jorge Contreras – Las Palmas – 1985–88
Pablo Contreras – Osasuna, Celta – 2001–02, 03–04, 05–07
Guillermo Díaz – Zaragoza – 1952–53
Marcelo Díaz – Celta – 2015–17
Matías Fernández – Villarreal – 2006–09
Gabriel Galleguillos – Salamanca – 1975–77
Mark González – Albacete, Real Sociedad, Betis – 2004–06, 07–09
Felipe Gutiérrez – Betis – 2016–17
Pablo Hernández – Celta – 2014–18
Osvaldo "Arica" Hurtado – Cádiz – 1985–86
Manuel Iturra – Málaga, Granada, Rayo, Villarreal – 2012–15, 15–16, 17–19
Igor Lichnovsky – Sporting – 2015–16
Guillermo Maripán – Alavés – 2017–20
Hans Martínez – Almería – 2013–14
Gary Medel – Sevilla – 2010–13
Francisco Molina – Atlético Madrid – 1953–57
Pedro Morales – Málaga – 2012–14
Raúl Muñoz – Numancia – 1999–00
Rafael Olarra – Osasuna – 2001–02
Fabián Orellana – Xerez, Granada, Celta, Valencia, Eibar, Valladolid – 2009–10, 12–21
Mauricio Pinilla – Celta, Racing – 2003–04, 05–06
Waldo Ponce – Racing – 2010–11
Andrés Prieto – Espanyol – 1953–55
Bryan Rabello – Sevilla – 2012–14
Jaime Ramírez – Espanyol, Granada – 1952–54, 57–60, 63–64
Miguel Ramírez – Real Sociedad – 1995–96
Lorenzo "Lolo" Reyes – Betis – 2013–14
Enzo Roco – Elche, Espanyol – 2014–16, 21–
Francisco Rojas – Tenerife – 1996–97
Alexis Sánchez – Barcelona – 2011–14
César Santis – Espanyol – 1999–00
Fernando Santís – Las Palmas – 1985–86
José Luis Sierra – Valladolid – 1989–90
Francisco Silva – Osasuna – 2012–14
Humberto Suazo – Zaragoza – 2009–10
Eduardo Vargas – Valencia – 2013–14
Marcelo Vega – Logroñés – 1992–93
Arturo Vidal – Barcelona – 2018–20
Oscar Wirth – Valladolid – 1986–88
Patricio Yáñez – Valladolid, Zaragoza, Betis – 1982–89
Iván Zamorano – Sevilla, Real Madrid – 1990–96

Colombia 

Abel Aguilar – Zaragoza, Hércules, Deportivo – 2009–11, 12–13
Leonel Álvarez – Valladolid – 1990–92
Brayan Angulo – Granada – 2012–14
Santiago Arias – Atlético Madrid, Granada – 2018–20, 21–22
Víctor Aristizábal – Valencia – 1993–94
Carlos Bacca – Sevilla, Villarreal, Granada – 2013–15, 17–22
Víctor Bonilla – Real Sociedad – 1999–00
Edwin Congo – Valladolid, Real Madrid, Levante, Recreativo – 1999–00, 01–02, 04–05, 07–08
Jhon Córdoba – Espanyol, Granada – 2013–15
Mauricio Cuero – Levante – 2015–16
José de la Cuesta – Cádiz – 2005–06
Bernardo Espinosa – Sevilla, Racing, Sporting, Girona, Espanyol – 2010–12, 15–16, 17–20, 22–
Radamel Falcao – Atlético Madrid, Rayo – 2011–13, 21–
Gilberto García – Valladolid – 2013–14
Miguel Guerrero – Mérida – 1995–96
Juan Camilo "Cucho" Hernández – Huesca, Mallorca, Getafe – 2018–21
René Higuita – Valladolid – 1991–92
Fredy Hinestroza – Getafe – 2014–15
Jefferson Lerma – Levante – 2015–16, 17–18
John Harold Lozano – Valladolid, Mallorca – 1996–03
Jeison Lucumí – Elche – 2020–21
Daniel Luna – Mallorca – 2022–
Jackson Martínez – Atlético Madrid – 2015–16
Roger Martínez – Villarreal – 2017–18
Yerry Mina – Barcelona – 2017–18
Johan Mojica – Rayo, Girona, Elche, Villarreal – 2013–14, 17–19, 20–
Faryd Mondragón – Zaragoza – 1998–99
Jhon Steven Mondragón – Osasuna – 2016–17
Marlos Moreno – Deportivo, Girona – 2016–18
Aquivaldo Mosquera – Sevilla – 2007–09
Luis Muriel – Sevilla – 2017–19
Jeison Murillo – Granada, Valencia, Barcelona, Celta – 2013–15, 17–19, 19–22
Juan José Narváez – Betis, Valladolid – 2017–18, 22–
Carlos Navarro Montoya – Extremadura, Mérida, Tenerife – 1996–99
Humberto Osorio – Valladolid – 2013–14
Dorlan Pabón – Betis, Valencia – 2012–13, 13–14
Helibelton Palacios – Elche – 2020–
Luis Perea – Atlético Madrid – 2004–12
Marco Pérez – Zaragoza – 2010–11
Léider Preciado – Racing – 1998–99, 00–01
Adrián Ramos – Granada – 2016–17, 19–20
Freddy Rincón – Real Madrid – 1995–96
James Rodríguez – Real Madrid – 2014–17, 19–20
Carlos Sánchez – Elche, Espanyol – 2013–14, 17–18
Rafael Santos Borré – Villarreal – 2016–17
Andrés Solano – Atlético Madrid – 2018–19
Luis Suárez – Granada, Almería – 2020–22, 22–
Daniel Torres – Alavés – 2016–19
Albeiro Usuriaga – Málaga – 1989–90
Carlos Valderrama – Valladolid – 1991–92
Adolfo Valencia – Atlético Madrid – 1994–95
Fabián Vargas – Almería – 2009–11
Jhon Viáfara – Real Sociedad – 2005–06
Cristián Zapata – Villarreal – 2011–12

Ecuador 

Felipe Caicedo – Málaga, Levante, Espanyol – 2009–11, 14–17
Pervis Estupiñán – Granada, Osasuna, Villarreal – 2016–17, 19–22
Joffre Guerrón – Getafe – 2008–09
Iván Hurtado – Murcia – 2003–04
Carlos Juárez – Murcia – 2003–04
Iván Kaviedes – Celta, Valladolid – 1999–01, 02–03
Jefferson Montero – Villarreal, Levante, Betis, Getafe – 2010–12, 17–18
Gonzalo Plata – Valladolid – 2022–
Stiven Plaza – Valladolid – 2018–19
Antonio Valencia – Villarreal – 2005–06
Joel Valencia – Zaragoza – 2011–12

Paraguay 

Ignacio Achúcarro – Sevilla – 1958–68
Bernardo Acosta – Sevilla – 1969–72
Javier Acuña – Osasuna – 2013–14
Roberto Acuña – Zaragoza, Deportivo – 1997–03, 04–06
Juan Agüero – Sevilla, Real Madrid, Granada – 1958–67
Óscar Aguilera – Sevilla – 1958–59, 60–61
Secundino Aifuch – Espanyol – 1978–82
Antolín Alcaraz – Las Palmas – 2015–16
Omar Alderete – Valencia, Getafe – 2021–
Júnior Alonso – Celta – 2018–19
Florencio Amarilla – Oviedo, Elche – 1958–62
Raúl Vicente Amarilla – Zaragoza, Barcelona – 1981–88
Aníbal Pérez – Valencia – 1968–75
Saturnino Arrúa – Zaragoza – 1973–77, 78–79
Santiago Arzamendia – Cádiz – 2021–
Atilio – Atlético Madrid – 1953–55
José Raúl Aveiro – Valencia, Elche – 1959–61, 63–64
Rubén Aveiro – Atlético Madrid – 1947–48
Celso Ayala – Betis, Atlético Madrid – 1998–00
Carlos Báez – Salamanca, Burgos – 1977–81
Domingo Benegas – Burgos, Atlético Madrid – 1971–79
Epifanio Benítez – Elche – 1975–78
Gustavo Benítez – Granada – 1975–76
Miguel Ángel Benítez – Atlético Madrid, Espanyol – 1993–02
Ángel Bernit – Betis – 1959–60
Manuel Bogado – Córdoba – 1966–67
Óscar Bravo – Oviedo – 1972–74
Eugenio Cabral – Burgos, Valencia, Almería, Hércules – 1976–79, 80–82
Pedro Cabral – Sevilla, Málaga – 1963–69, 70–71
César Cabrera – Córdoba – 1963–66
Diómedes Cabrera – Racing – 1977–78
Amando Cáceres – Hércules, Mallorca – 1966–67, 69–70
Julio César Cáceres – Gimnàstic – 2006–07
Adalberto Cañete – Salamanca – 1976–77
Juan Casco – Elche, Murcia – 1965–70, 73–75
Benigno Chaparro – Salamanca, Racing – 1978–79, 82–83, 84–85
José Luis Chilavert – Zaragoza – 1988–91
Roberto Cino – Espanyol, Salamanca – 1973–74, 76–78
Carlos Correa – Tenerife – 1961–62
Paulo da Silva – Zaragoza – 2010–12
Carlos Diarte – Zaragoza, Valencia, Salamanca, Betis – 1973–83
Jorge dos Santos – Sevilla, Cádiz – 1975–77, 81–82, 83–84
Jorge Escobar – Granada, Elche – 1973–75
Pedro Fernández – Barcelona, Granada – 1968–76
Roberto Fernández – Espanyol – 1976–78
Buenaventura Ferreira – Sabadell – 1986–87
Valeriano Ferreira – Granada – 1968–69
Virgilio Ferreira – Extremadura – 1996–97
Diego Figueredo – Valladolid – 2003–04
Sebastián Fleitas – Málaga, Real Madrid – 1968–72
Víctor Franco – Córdoba – 1967–68
Alejandro Fretes – Racing, Atlético Madrid – 1961–62, 65–66
Carlos Gamarra – Atlético Madrid – 1999–00
Inocente Gaona – Deportivo – 1968–69
Rubén Gárate – Córdoba – 1964–65
Genaro García – Elche – 1968–70
Néstor García – Pontevedra, Murcia – 1969–70, 73–74
Orlando Giménez – Racing, Valencia, Espanyol, Sabadell – 1976–87
Eduardo Gómez – Granada – 1973–74
Hermes González – Barcelona, Oviedo – 1957–62
Ricardo González – Elche – 1968–71, 73–76
Ramón Hicks – Sabadell, Oviedo – 1986–87, 88–90
Jorge Insfrán – Zaragoza – 1975–76
Mario Jacquet – Burgos, Oviedo, Valladolid – 1971–74, 75–76, 80–81
Vicente Raúl Jara – Sabadell – 1970–71
Víctor Juárez – Granada, Murcia – 1970–72, 73–74
Fausto Laguardia – Elche – 1959–60
Gabriel Lezcano – Celta – 1969–75
Juan Carlos Lezcano – Elche – 1962–71
Óscar Lleida – Valencia – 1975–76
Óscar López – Almería – 1979–80
Crispín Maciel – Granada, Las Palmas – 1973–74, 75–76, 77–80
Vidal Maciel – Murcia – 1973–74
Adolfo Martínez – Deportivo – 1968–70
Eulogio Martínez – Barcelona, Elche, Atlético Madrid – 1956–65
Celso Mendieta – Betis, Zaragoza – 1974–77, 78–79
Aníbal Montero – Elche – 1973–78
Eulalio Mora – Cádiz – 1988–89
Claudio Morel – Deportivo – 2010–11
Víctor Morel – Espanyol – 1979–81
Felipe Nery – Elche – 1984–85
Humberto Núñez – Hércules – 1974–75, 76–78
Felipe Ocampos – Zaragoza – 1969–71, 72–74
Juan Ramón Ocampos – Valencia – 1975–76
Celso Ortigosa – Cádiz – 1977–78
Luis César Ortiz – Espanyol – 1973–78
José Parodi – Las Palmas – 1958–60
Silvio Parodi – Racing – 1961–62
Abel Pérez – Murcia – 1973–75
Hernán Pérez – Villarreal, Espanyol, Alavés – 2011–12, 13–14, 15–19
Cayetano Ré – Elche, Barcelona, Espanyol – 1959–69, 70–71
Carlos Riquelme – Atlético Madrid – 1953–55
Juan Francisco Riveros – Pontevedra – 1968–70
Juan Carlos Rojas – Córdoba – 1968–69, 71–72
Clemente Rolón – Almería, Salamanca – 1979–81, 82–83
Julio César Romero "Romerito" – Barcelona – 1988–89
Francisco Romero – Espanyol, Sporting – 1967–69, 70–74
Jorge Lino Romero – Oviedo – 1958–61
Juan Romero – Elche – 1960–67
Óscar Romero – Alavés – 2016–18
Antonio "Tonny" Sanabria – Sporting, Betis – 2015–19, 20–21
Carlos Sanabria – Valencia – 1959–60
Roque Santa Cruz – Betis, Málaga – 2011–15, 15–16
Delio Toledo – Espanyol, Zaragoza – 1999–01, 03–06
Herminio Toñánez – Sevilla – 1969–72
Nelson Valdez – Hércules, Valencia – 2010–11, 12–13
Crispín Verza – Murcia – 1973–74
Florencio Villalba – Real Burgos – 1992–93
Jerónimo Villalba – Sevilla – 1975–77
Justo Villar – Valladolid – 2008–10
Víctor Zayas – Zaragoza – 1980–85
Nelson Zelaya – Recreativo – 2002–03

Peru 

Luis Abram – Granada – 2021–22
Santiago Acasiete – Almería – 2007–11
Luis Advíncula – Rayo – 2018–19
Pedro Aicart – Málaga – 1976–77
Juan Caballero – Elche – 1984–85
Alexander Callens – Girona – 2022–
Christian Cueva – Rayo – 2013–14
Alfonso Dulanto – Mérida – 1995–96
Jean Franco Ferrari – Extremadura – 1998–99
Damián Ísmodes – Racing – 2007–08
Juan José Jayo – Celta, Las Palmas – 2000–02
Germán Leguía – Elche – 1984–85
Alberto Loret de Mola – Las Palmas – 1958–60
Flavio Maestri – Hércules – 1996–97
Óscar Montalvo – Deportivo – 1962–63, 64–65, 66–67
Juan Carlos Oblitas – Elche – 1975–76
Percy Olivares – Tenerife – 1993–95
Miguel Rebosio – Zaragoza – 2000–02, 03–04
Luis Redher – Zaragoza – 1989–90
Juan Seminario – Zaragoza, Barcelona, Sabadell – 1961–63, 64–69
Sigifrido Martínez "Sigi" – Zaragoza, Elche – 1962–67, 67–69
José del Solar – Tenerife, Salamanca, Celta, Valencia – 1992–98
Hugo Sotil – Barcelona – 1973–74, 75–77
Renato Tapia – Celta – 2020–
Juan Manuel Vargas – Betis – 2015–16
José Manuel Velásquez – Hércules – 1984–85
Pablo Zegarra – Salamanca – 1997–99

Uruguay 

Nelson Abeijón – Racing – 1997–98
Sebastián Abreu – Deportivo – 1997–98
Juan Alberto Acosta – Real Madrid – 1982–83
Luis Aguerre – Celta – 1973–75
Matías Aguirregaray – Las Palmas – 2017–18
Juan Ángel Albín – Getafe, Espanyol – 2006–13
Daniel Alonso – Sevilla – 1975–77
Diego Alonso – Valencia, Racing, Málaga – 2000–01, 02–04
Iván Alonso – Alavés, Murcia, Espanyol – 2000–03, 07–08, 08–11
Gastón Álvarez – Getafe – 2022–
Roberto Álvarez – Rayo – 1979–80
Antonio Alzamendi – Logroñés – 1988–90
Alfredo Amarillo – Barcelona, Salamanca, Espanyol – 1976–80, 81–82
Juan Carlos Aparicio – Celta – 1973–75
Mauro Arambarri – Getafe – 2017–
Ronald Araújo – Barcelona – 2019–
Matías Arezo – Granada – 2021–22
Marsol Arias – Tenerife – 1990–91
Julian Arguedas – Atlético Madrid, Sevilla, Recreativo – 1968–69, 69–70, 71–72
Danilo Baltierra – Logroñés – 1996–97
Fernando Barboza – Elche – 1988–89
Daniel Bartolotta – Oviedo – 1975–76
Eduardo Belza – Atlético Madrid, Mallorca, Tenerife – 1980–81, 86–88, 89–90
Pablo Bengoechea – Sevilla – 1987–92
Julio César Benítez – Valladolid, Zaragoza, Barcelona – 1959–68
Danny Bergara – Mallorca, Sevilla – 1962–63, 65–66, 67–68, 69–71
Ignacio Bergara – Mallorca, Espanyol – 1962–63, 64–69
Juan Carlos Blanco – Zaragoza – 1973–77
Miguel Bossio – Valencia, Albacete – 1987–91, 92–93
Julio César Britos – Real Madrid – 1953–54
Santiago Bueno – Girona – 2022–
Erick Cabaco – Levante, Getafe – 2017–22
Hugo Cabezas – Betis – 1977–78, 79–80
Jacinto Cabrera – Valladolid – 1986–88
Leandro Cabrera – Atlético Madrid, Getafe, Espanyol – 2009–10, 17–20, 21–
Wilmar Cabrera – Valencia, Sporting – 1984–86, 87–88
Martín Cáceres – Recreativo, Barcelona, Sevilla, Levante – 2007–09, 10–12, 21–22
Pablo Cáceres – Mallorca – 2011–12
Daniel Cambón – Zaragoza – 1975–76
Richard Camera – Celta – 1976–77
Ricardo Canals – Logroñés – 1996–97
Fabián Canobbio – Valencia, Celta, Valladolid – 2003–04, 05–07, 08–10
Fabián Carini – Murcia – 2007–08
Juan Ramón Carrasco – Cádiz – 1986–87
Gonzalo "Chory" Castro – Mallorca, Real Sociedad, Málaga – 2007–18
Edinson Cavani – Valencia – 2022–
Javier Chevantón – Sevilla – 2006–10
Juan Contreras – Celta – 1985–86
Mateo Corbo – Oviedo – 1999–00
Gabriel Correa – Valladolid, Mérida – 1993–94, 95–96, 97–98
Fernando Correa – Atlético Madrid, Racing, Mallorca – 1995–00, 02–05
Sebastián Cristóforo – Sevilla, Getafe, Eibar – 2013–16, 18–19, 19–20
Luis Cubilla – Barcelona – 1962–64
José Custodio – Rayo – 1979–80
Jorge da Silva – Valladolid, Atlético Madrid – 1982–87
Rubén da Silva – Logroñés – 1991–92
Mirto Davoine – Mallorca – 1960–62
Hugo de León – Logroñés – 1987–88
Lautaro de León – Celta – 2020–21
Jorge "Chispa" Delgado – Numancia – 1999–01
Gonzalo de los Santos – Mérida, Málaga, Valencia, Atlético Madrid, Mallorca – 1997–98, 99–05
Diego López – Racing – 1996–98
Carlos Diogo – Real Madrid, Zaragoza – 2005–08, 09–11
Raúl dos Santos – Albacete – 1992–95
Sebastián Eguren – Villarreal, Sporting – 2007–12
Eduardo Endériz – Valladolid, Zaragoza, Barcelona, Sevilla – 1959–61, 62–68
Víctor Espárrago – Recreativo – 1978–79
Alfonso Espino – Cádiz – 2020–
Fabián Estoyanoff – Cádiz, Deportivo, Valladolid – 2005–08
Enrique Fernández – Barcelona – 1935–36
Gabriel Fernández – Celta – 2019–20
Gustavo Fernández – Sevilla, Murcia – 1976–79, 80–81
Seba Fernández – Málaga, Rayo – 2010–14
Andrés Fleurquín – Cádiz – 2005–06
Diego Forlán – Villarreal, Atlético Madrid – 2004–11
Pablo García – Osasuna, Real Madrid, Celta, Murcia – 2002–08
Voltaire García – Málaga – 1976–77
Eduardo Gerolami – Sevilla – 1978–80
José Giménez – Atlético Madrid – 2013–
Diego Godín – Villarreal, Atlético Madrid – 2007–19
Maximiliano Gómez – Celta, Valencia – 2017–23
Alejandro González – Albacete – 1995–96
Giovanni González – Mallorca – 2021–
Juan González – Oviedo, Atlético Madrid – 1997–01
Ramiro Guerra Pereyra – Villarreal – 2017–18
Adrián Gunino – Córdoba – 2014–15
Álvaro Gutiérrez – Valladolid – 1995–99
Carlos Gutiérrez – Málaga, Jaén, Las Palmas – 1950–51, 52–55
Nelson Gutiérrez – Logroñés – 1990–93
Germán Hornos – Sevilla – 2003–04
Diego Ifrán – Real Sociedad – 2010–13
Diego Jaume – Numancia – 1999–01
Carlos Jurado – Betis – 1971–72
Gary Kagelmacher – Real Madrid – 2008–09
Andrés Lamas – Recreativo – 2008–09
Carlos Lasanta – Hércules – 1977–78
Martín Lasarte – Deportivo – 1991–92
Pierino Lattuada – Hércules – 1977–79
Alejandro Lembo – Betis – 2003–07
Mauricio Lemos – Las Palmas – 2015–18
Martín Ligüera – Mallorca – 2003–04
Nicolás López – Granada – 2015–16
Julio César Lorant – Sevilla, Elche – 1975–78
Diego Lugano – Málaga – 2012–13
José Lujambio – Deportivo – 1949–50
Federico Magallanes – Racing, Sevilla – 1998–99, 00–01, 03–04
Alberto Martínez – Las Palmas – 1982–83
Manteca Martínez – Deportivo – 1997–98
Ladislao Mazurkiewicz – Granada – 1974–75
Alexandre Medina – Cádiz – 2005–06
Peter Méndez – Mallorca – 1991–92
Denís Milar – Granada – 1975–76
Dagoberto Moll – Deportivo, Barcelona, Condal, Celta, Elche – 1949–55, 56–58, 59–60
Julio Montero – Granada – 1973–75
Richard Morales – Osasuna, Málaga – 2002–06
Fernando Morena – Rayo, Valencia – 1979–81
Gustavo Munúa – Deportivo, Málaga, Levante – 2003–13
Amaro Carlos Nadal – Sevilla, Logroñés – 1985–88
Álvaro Núñez – Numancia – 1999–01, 04–05
Héctor Núñez – Valencia, Mallorca – 1959–66
Richard Núñez – Atlético Madrid – 2004–05
Brian Ocampo – Cádiz – 2022–
Lucas Olaza – Celta, Valladolid, Elche – 2018–21, 21–
Christian Oliva – Valencia – 2020–21
Mathías Olivera – Getafe – 2017–18, 18–22
Nicolás Olivera – Valencia, Sevilla, Valladolid, Albacete – 1997–98, 99–00, 01–03, 04–05
Rubén Olivera – Atlético Madrid – 2003–04
Sergio Orteman – Racing – 2007–08
Marcelo Otero – Sevilla – 1999–00
Julio Outerelo – Celta – 1954–55
Antonio Pacheco – Espanyol, Albacete – 2001–02, 03–05
Walter Pandiani – Deportivo, Mallorca, Espanyol, Osasuna – 2000–05, 05–12
Miguel Peirano – Sevilla – 1984–85
Walter Peletti – Castellón – 1989–91
Facundo Pellistri – Alavés – 2020–22
Horacio Peralta – Albacete – 2004–05
José Perdomo – Betis – 1990–91
Álvaro Pereira – Getafe – 2015–16
Carlos Peruena – Betis – 1979–82
Leonel Pilipauskas – Atlético Madrid – 1999–00
Mario Pini – Valladolid, Mallorca, Sabadell – 1962–64, 65–66, 67–72
Pablo Pintos – Getafe – 2010–11
Inti Podestá – Sevilla – 1999–00, 01–04
Gustavo Poyet – Zaragoza – 1990–97
Luis Prais – Barcelona – 1949–50
Gerardo Rabajda – Sevilla – 1999–00
Héctor Ramos – Real Madrid, Racing, Elche – 1958–59, 60–65, 66–67
Leo Ramos – Salamanca – 1998–99
Mario Regueiro – Racing, Valencia, Murcia – 2000–01, 02–08
Omar Rey – Hércules, Burgos – 1975–77
Federico Ricca – Málaga – 2015–18
Martín Rivas – Málaga – 2000–01
Álvaro Rodríguez – Real Madrid – 2022–
Braian Rodríguez – Betis – 2013–14
Cristian Rodríguez – Atlético Madrid – 2012–15
Fernando Rodríguez – Tenerife – 1961–62
Jonathan Rodríguez – Deportivo – 2015–16
José Rodríguez – Valladolid – 1962–64
Sergio Rodríguez – Málaga, Real Madrid, Hércules – 1950–51, 52–56
Diego Rolán – Málaga, Leganés, Alavés – 2017–19
Marcelo Romero – Málaga – 2001–06
Ricardo Salaberry – Oviedo – 1949–50, 52–54
Gabriel Sánchez Pose – Cádiz – 1989–92
Michael Santos – Málaga, Leganés – 2016–17, 18–19
Marcelo Saracchi – Levante – 2021–22
Darío Silva – Espanyol, Málaga, Sevilla – 1998–05
Gastón Silva – Granada, Huesca – 2016–17, 20–21
Tabaré Silva – Sevilla – 1999–00
Alcides Silveira – Barcelona – 1962–63
Alfredo Sosa – Pontevedra – 1963–64
Marcelo Sosa – Atlético Madrid, Osasuna – 2004–06
Rubén Sosa – Zaragoza, Logroñés – 1985–88, 96–97
Rafael Souto – Atlético Madrid – 1954–56
Christian Stuani – Levante, Racing, Espanyol, Girona – 2010–15, 17–19, 22–
Damián Suárez – Sporting, Elche, Getafe – 2011–12, 13–16, 17–
Edison Suárez – Zaragoza – 1990–92
Luis Suárez – Barcelona, Atlético Madrid – 2014–22
Sebastián Taborda – Deportivo – 2005–08
Washington Tais – Racing, Betis – 1997–05
Marcelo Tejera – Logroñés – 1996–97
Lucas Torreira – Atlético Madrid – 2020–21
Jonathan Urretaviscaya – Deportivo – 2010–11
Federico Valverde – Deportivo, Real Madrid – 2017–
Ernesto Vargas – Oviedo – 1988–89
Emiliano Velázquez – Getafe, Rayo – 2014–16, 18–19
Sebastián Viera – Villarreal – 2005–09
Hugo Villamide – Espanyol – 1957–59
Ramón Villaverde – Barcelona – 1954–63
Marcelo Zalayeta – Sevilla – 1999–00
José Luis Zalazar – Cádiz, Albacete, Racing – 1987–88, 91–97
Adolfo Javier Zeoli – Tenerife – 1989–90

Venezuela 

Julio Álvarez – Racing, Rayo, Murcia, Almería, Mallorca – 2000–01, 02–04, 08–10
Fernando Amorebieta – Athletic Bilbao, Sporting – 2005–13, 16–17
Juan Arango – Mallorca – 2004–09
Daniel Hernández "Dani" – Valladolid – 2012–13
Yangel Herrera – Huesca, Granada, Espanyol, Girona – 2018–
Juan Pablo Añor "Juanpi" – Málaga, Huesca – 2014–18, 18–19
Darwin Machís – Granada, Leganés, Valladolid – 2012–13, 14–15, 16–17, 19–22, 22–
Giancarlo Maldonado – Xerez – 2009–10
Nicolás Ladislao Fedor "Miku" – Valencia, Getafe, Rayo – 2009–13, 13–14, 14–16
Adalberto Peñaranda – Granada, Málaga – 2015–16, 16–18
Álex Pereira – Recreativo – 2002–03
Salomón Rondón – Málaga – 2010–12
Roberto Rosales – Málaga, Espanyol, Leganés – 2014–20
Christian Santos – Alavés – 2016–18
Juan Carlos Socorro – Las Palmas – 2001–02
Jeffrén Suárez – Barcelona, Valladolid – 2008–11, 13–14
Andrés Túñez – Celta – 2012–13
Mikel Villanueva – Málaga – 2016–17

See also
Oriundo

Notes

Sources
Foreign Players in the Spanish League (First Division) by RSSSF

 
 
Spain
Association football player non-biographical articles